= Artangel =

London-based arts organisation

- Founder: Roger Took
- Purpose: Arts organisation
- Headquarters: 31 Eyre Street Hill; London; EC1R 5EW
- Coordinates: 51°31′22″N 00°06′37″W
- Director: Mariam Zulfiqar
- Website: www.artangel.org.uk

Artangel is a London-based arts organisation founded in 1985 by Roger Took. The organisation was directed from 1991 by James Lingwood and Michael Morris, who stepped down in 2021 after three decades in the role. In 2022, Mariam Zulfiqar was appointed director. Over its history, the organisation has commissioned and produced a string of notable site-specific works, as well as projects for television, film, radio and the web. Notable past works include the Turner Prize-winning House by Rachel Whiteread (1993), Break Down by Michael Landy (2001) and Seizure by Roger Hiorns (2008–2010), also nominated for the Turner Prize in 2009.

A 2002 article in The Daily Telegraph described the organisation as creating "art that operates by ambush, rather than asking you to pay up before you see it", while a 2007 profile in The Observer noted that "Artangel has worked with exceptional artists to produce some of the most resonant works of our time, in some very unusual places". These have included a condemned council flat (Seizure, 2008–2010), a former postal sorting office (Küba, 2005), a vacated general plumbing store (An Area of Outstanding Unnatural Beauty, 2002) and the former Oxford Street branch of the C&A department store (Break Down, 2001).

== Ongoing projects ==
While many of Artangel's projects are intrinsically temporary, certain works have a longer-term remit.

1 January 2000 saw the launch of Jem Finer's Longplayer, a musical composition that will continue playing until the end of the year 2999. Longplayer can be heard via an online stream, at listening posts internationally and at occasional live performances.

In 2007, a former municipal library building in the Icelandic town of Stykkishólmur was transformed into VATNASAFN/Library of Water, a project by Roni Horn that includes an archive of glacial water and a selection of weather 'reports' by residents of Iceland. It operates as a community space and is host to a writers' residency programme.

Ilya and Emilia Kabakov's 1998 work The Palace of Projects resides permanently at a former salt store in the Zollverein Coal Mine Industrial Complex in Essen, Germany.

Notable patrons as special angels include Carolyn Dailey. Artangel were named one of London's most influential curators in 2017 by Something Curated.

== The Artangel Collection ==
Works, such as Richard Billingham's Fishtank (1998), Paul Pfeiffer's The Saints (2007) and Francis Alÿs' Seven Walks (2004), continue to be exhibited internationally as part of The Artangel Collection. The collection was launched in partnership with Tate in 2011 to enable notable film and video installations to be presented across the UK. Over 25 moving image works – commissioned by Artangel since 1993 – are available for loan, free of charge, to publicly funded UK museums and galleries.
