= John Greer (sculptor) =

Canadian artist (born 1944)

- Born: 1944 (age 81–82); Amherst, Nova Scotia, Canada
- Website: www.artistjohngreer.com

John Greer RCA (born 1944) is a Canadian sculptor who likes to bring cultural and natural history together. One critic calls him one of Canada's most philosophically minded artists. He looks to ancient Celtic stones and Greek sculpture for inspiration. Greer was the catalyst behind "Halifax Sculpture", a 1990s movement, rooted in minimalism and conceptualism.

== Life and work ==
Born in Amherst, Nova Scotia, Greer studied Fine Art from 1962 to 1967 in Halifax at the Nova Scotia School of Art (1963–1964), at the Montreal Museum of Fine Arts school (sculpture, 1966) and at the Vancouver School of Art (painting, 1967). He has exhibited his work since 1967 extensively in Canada, USA, South Korea and Europe. He taught sculpture at NSCAD University in Halifax for 26 years and is based in Lunenburg County, Nova Scotia, and Pietrasanta, Italy. By the late 1980s, Greer adapted the stone carving process by applying conceptual and post-minimalist ideas to his art which inspired many young artists in the "Halifax Sculpture" movement.

He views sculpture as his language and tries to engage the viewer in his work. Greer has had the admiration of his artist-peers for many years, as the following quote from Ron Shuebrook, writing in 1987, suggests.

...it is Greer's carved marble and cast bronze sculptures that confirm his place as one of the most compellingly thoughtful and accomplished sculptors at work in Canada.

His exhibits include:

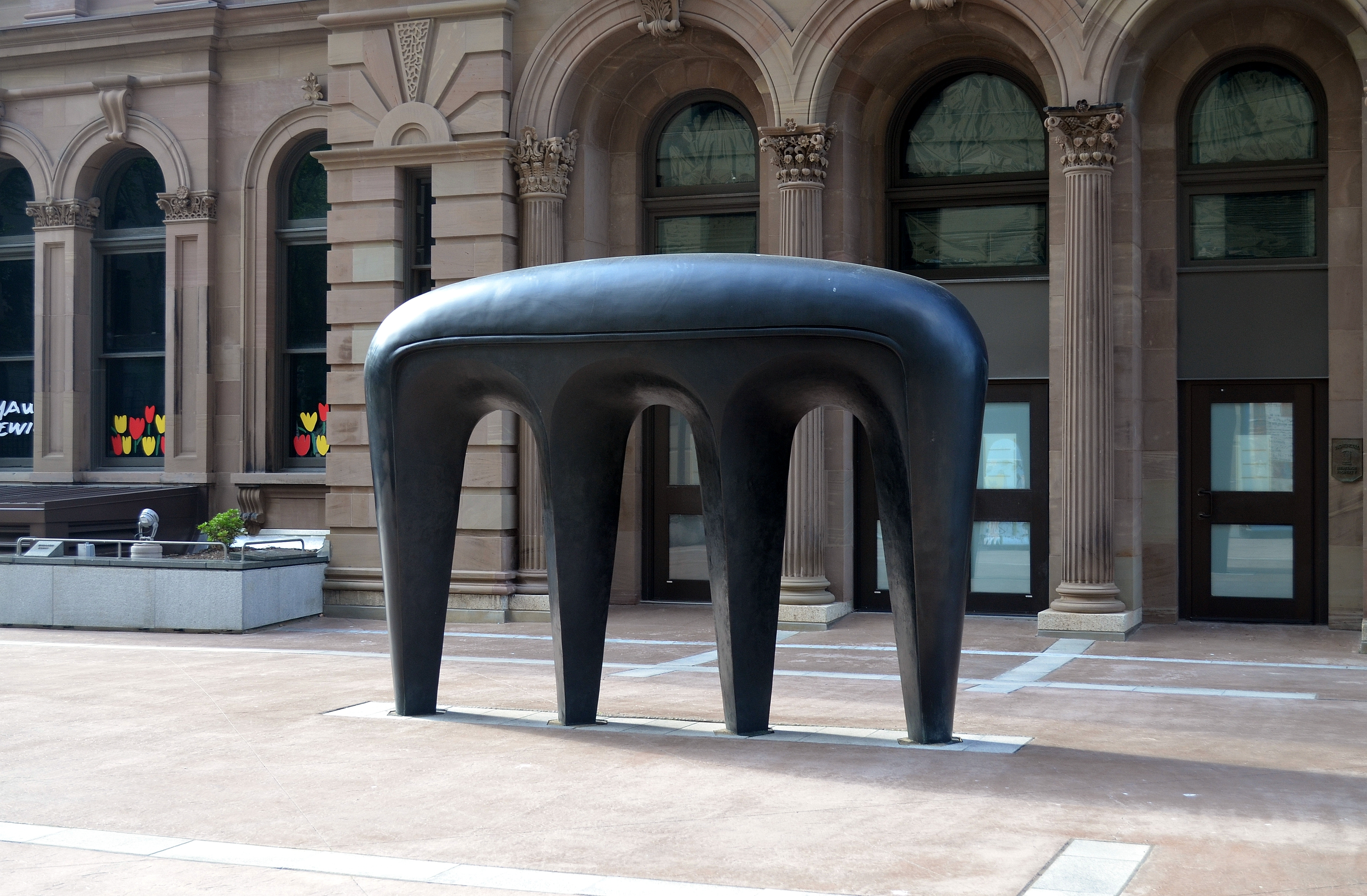
Origins (1995), installed outside the Art Gallery of Nova Scotia in Halifax

- Connected Works, 1987 is a solo exhibit at the Dalhousie Art Gallery.
- Reconciliation, 1989, is a bronze and marble work obtained by the National Gallery of Canada in 1993.
- Origins, 1995 is permanently installed in the Ondaatje courtyard of the Art Gallery of Nova Scotia.
- Gathering, 2001, adjacent to the National Museum in Yongsan Family Park in Seoul, Korea.
- Reflection, 2001, the Monument to Canadian Aid Workers memorial to Canadian Aid Workers in Ottawa, Canada.
- Reflecting on Culture in Halifax, NS in 2006.
- Alluding to Allusion April, 2008 in Brookhaven College, Farmers Branch, Texas.

In 2009, he installed the piece Humble Ending in La Serpara, a sculpture garden North of Rome. He held the solo exhibition of APPRÉHENSION - APPREHENSION at Galerie Samuel Lallouz in Montreal, Quebec in 2009. In 2011, his work The Sirens was permanently installed in a private park in Switzerland. The large-scale installation Cradle was completed in the spring of 2012 for the same private collection. In 2014, Greer co-founded "Intercontinental Sculpture Inc.", in order to be able to handle more successfully the business part of creating art for the public domain.

The Art Gallery of Nova Scotia had a major travelling retrospective of Greer's work, retroActive, curated by David Diviney, which opened in 2015. A reviewer wrote that the real story of this exhibition was that Greer changed from being a sculptor whose work was based on theory to being one who was object-based. In 2017, he installed The Rule of Law is a Reflection of Us All in the McMurtry Gardens of Justice in Toronto. Also in 2017, he created the Canadian Building Trades Unions Monument, a collaboration with architect Brian MacKay-Lyons, for the Canadian Building Trades Unions which is now located in the collection of the National Capitol Collection in Ottawa. It won the "Award of Merit: Public Places and Civic Spaces" in the Urban Design Awards of the city of Ottawa.

Greer is the recipient of numerous awards and grants; in 2009, he received one of the prestigious Governor General's Awards in Visual and Media Arts in recognition of his lifetime achievement and significant contribution to contemporary Canadian visual art. He received the Victor Martyn Lynch-Staunton Award (1998) from the Canada Council for the Arts and first prize at the 1991 International Sculpture Symposium, "Matière à Musée" in Montreal.

Greer was a founding member of one of Canada's first artist-run centres (Eyelevel Gallery), and is a long-term supporter of CARFAC (Canadian Artists' Representation/Le Front des artistes Canadiens).

== Honours ==
- Victor Martyn Lynch-Staunton Award (1987)
- Royal Canadian Academy of Arts
- Governor General's Award in Visual and Media Arts
