= Gunnersbury Park =

Park in west London, England

Coordinates: 51.498°N 0.292°W

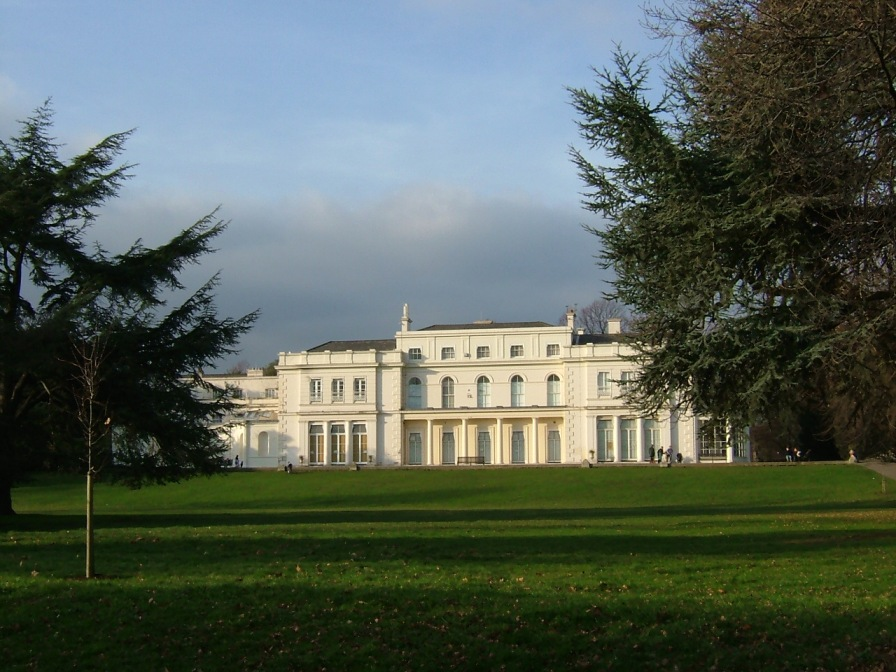
- The Large Mansion at Gunnersbury
- Ceremonial county: Greater London
- Region: London
- Country: England
- Sovereign state: United Kingdom
- Post town: LONDON
- Postcode district: W
- Dialling code: 020
- Police: Metropolitan
- Fire: London
- Ambulance: London

Gunnersbury Park is a park between Acton, Brentford, Chiswick and Ealing, West London, England. Purchased for the nation from the Rothschild family, it was opened to the public by Neville Chamberlain, then Minister of Health, on 21 May 1926. The park is currently jointly managed by Hounslow and Ealing borough councils. A major restoration project funded by the Heritage Lottery Fund was completed in 2018. The park and garden is Grade II listed.

Under Leopold de Rothschild in the later 19th century, the park and gardens were greatly developed into a leading example of the new type of woodland garden, relying heavily on new plants from Asia. Other features included a more formal "Italian Garden", Victorian scattered flower-beds, an orangery largely in glass, a rock garden, and an early example of a "Japanese garden" in England. All of these survive.

== History ==
=== Origins ===
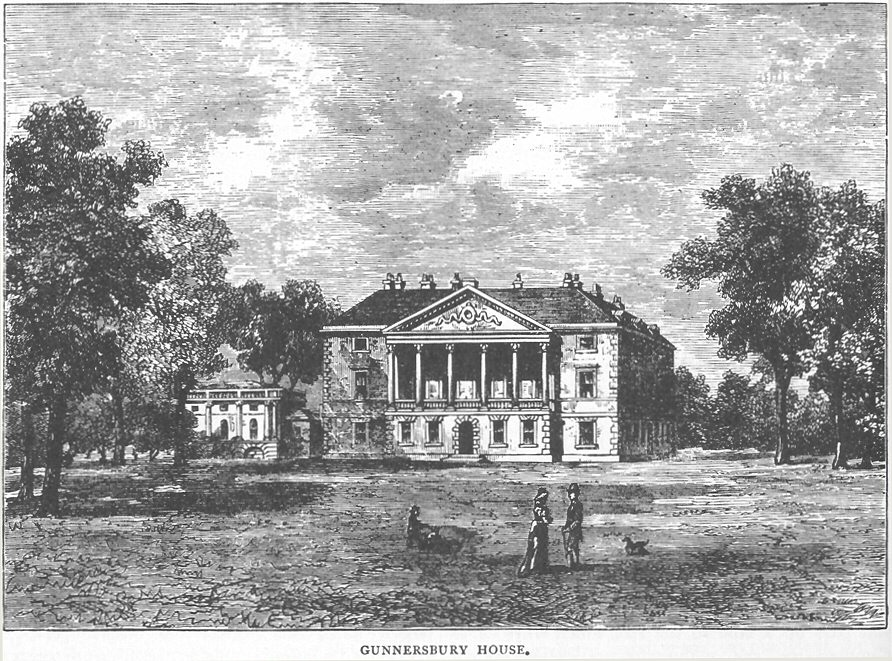
The original Gunnersbury House around 1750.

The name Gunnersbury derives from Gunylda, the niece of King Canute who lived there until her banishment from England in 1044. The manor, owned by the Bishop of London, was occupied by the Frowyk family in the 15th century; Sir Thomas Frowyk, Chief Justice of the Common Pleas was born there in 1460.

=== Early modern era ===
In the mid-17th century, Gunnersbury was acquired by Sir John Maynard, a lawyer and politician during the time of Cromwell. In around 1663, he built Gunnersbury House, a Palladian mansion modelled on the Villa Badoer, and designed by John Webb, the pupil and son-in-law of Inigo Jones. A map of Ealing dated 1777, shows the house in the north-east corner of the park, facing a horseshoe-shaped lake.

The house was bought in 1739 from Maynard's great-grandson John Hobart, 1st Earl of Buckinghamshire by wealthy merchant and MP Henry Furnese, after whose death in 1756 it was sold to Princess Amelia, the daughter of George II.

Daniel Defoe visited Gunnersbury in 1742. He wrote: "...(The Mansion) stands on an eminence, the ground falling gradually from it to the Brentford Road; from the Portico…you have an exceeding fine prospect of the County of Surrey, the river Thames…and a good prospect of London in clear weather…"

=== Princess Amelia ===
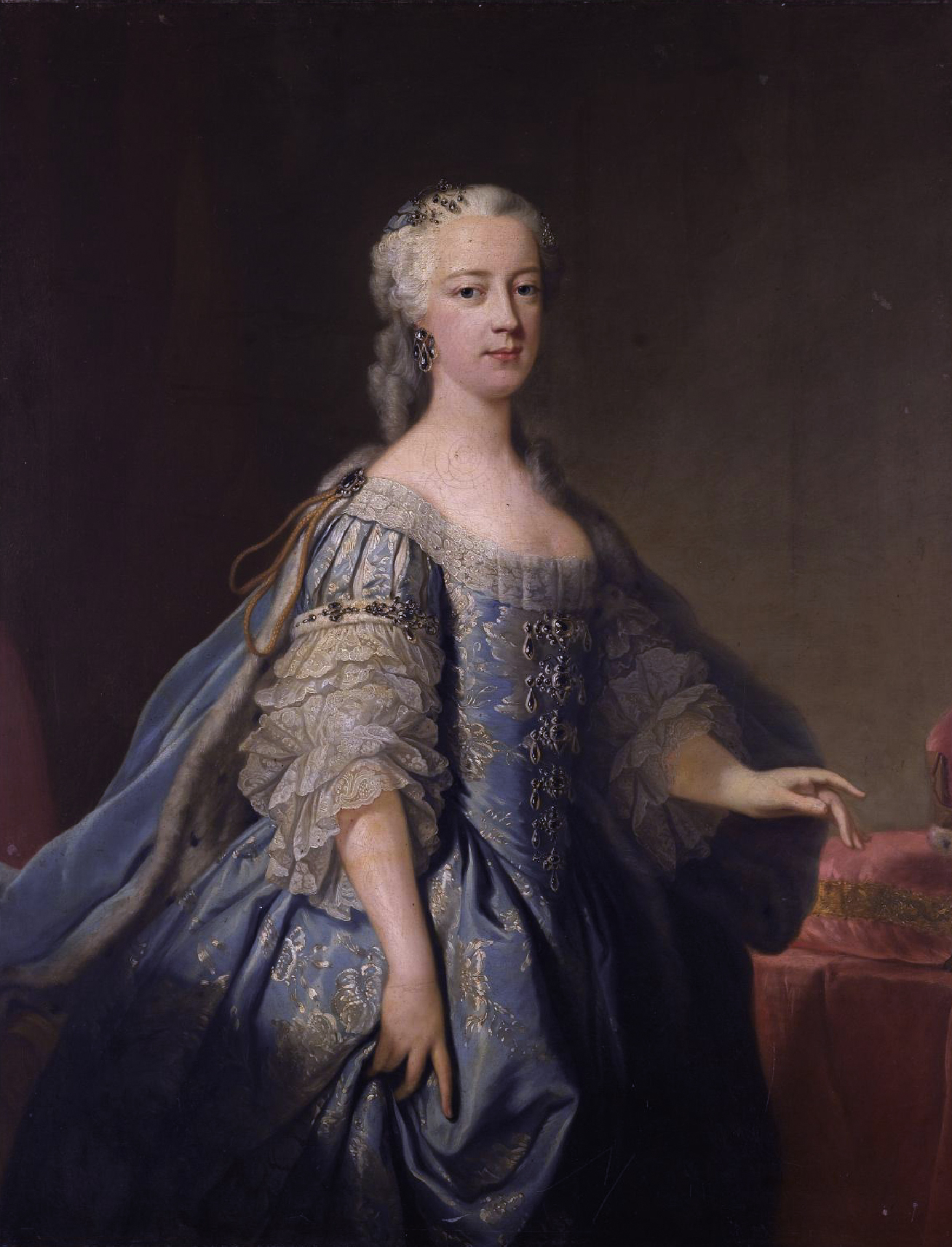
Princess Amelia landscaped the park.

In 1760, the house and estate were purchased for Princess Amelia, favourite daughter of George II. Plans for her to marry Prince Frederick of Prussia (who later became Frederick the Great of Prussia) had come to nothing, and when her father died, Amelia had lost her apartments at St James's Palace. She took a house in Hanover Square and used Gunnersbury House and estate as a country summer retreat. Amelia – George III's aunt, "that odd and hearty lady" – made Gunnersbury famous with her parties and political intrigues. The previous owner, Henry Furnese, had the grounds landscaped by William Kent in the 18th-century landscape style. Princess Amelia continued this, building a bathhouse in the grounds.

=== 19th century ===
After Amelia died in 1786, the estate had a number of owners. In 1788 it was acquired by Colonel Ironside, who sold it again in 1792 to a Walter Stirling. John Morley decided in 1801 to pull down the mansion and sell the land off piecemeal in 13 lots (the old house occupying Lot 2). The lots were eventually acquired by only two people, Alexander Copland (10 lots in 1802 and a further two in 1806), and Stephen Cosser (Lot 1 in 1802, sold to Major Alexander Morrison in 1807). Two separate estates were then established, each with its own new house. Copland, who bought 76 acres/30 hectares (most of the original grounds), was a builder and business partner of Henry Holland, and built the "Large Mansion" which was known, with its grounds, as "Gunnersbury Park".

The "Small Mansion" was built virtually alongside in around 1806–1809, the builders evidently recognising the suitability of the position – an elevated terrace overlooking the horseshoe-lake near where the original mansion had stood. The small mansion and grounds were known as "Gunnersbury House".

=== Rothschilds ===
In 1835, the merchant and financier Nathan Mayer Rothschild purchased the Large Mansion and park shortly before he died. The Small Mansion and its grounds were acquired in 1889 by the Rothschilds from the Thomas Farmer family (who had owned it since 1828), finally reuniting the original estate. The Rothschilds extended Gunnersbury further, acquiring most of the Old Brentford Common Field to the west, as well as land to the north. An old clay-pit in the south-west, "Cole’s Hole", was landscaped to become the Potomac lake, and the tile-kiln beside it modified to become a boat-house disguised as a gothic folly. An orangery was built in 1836 to a design by Sydney Smirke.

=== 20th century ===
In 1925, following the death of Nathan's grandson Leopold de Rothschild, Leopold's wife, Maria, and son Lionel, sold the 200-acre (81 ha) Gunnersbury estate, which was entirely contained within the Brentford Urban District, to the adjacent Ealing Borough Council and Acton Borough Council for £130,000. The land lay entirely outside their boundaries. The "Queen of the Suburbs" did not want more municipal housing, as would likely be built by Brentford under its policies, on its doorstep and the Mayor of Acton concurred, persuading her Borough Council to make it a joint purchase.

Following the First World War, there was a demand for house-building land. In addition the construction of the Great West Road, immediately south of the estate, was attracting modern industries along its "Golden Mile". Lionel Nathan de Rothschild had bought for his use Exbury House in 1919, by the English Channel and was investing in its fine, tourist attraction today, woodland garden, so selling Gunnersbury facilitated this. Disgruntled Ealing ratepayers wrote to the papers complaining about the burden on their rate bills. The adjacent Brentford and Chiswick Borough Council commented that since Ealing already had The Common and several other parks, not to mention Kew Gardens close by, another park would be unnecessary. They insisted that the greater part of the land should be used for housing, and opposed the loan of the purchase money to Ealing and Acton from the Ministry of Health. Depending on political view, "civic pride" or "snobbery" prevailed, and the Rothschilds sold Gunnersbury on condition that it was only to be used for leisure and recreation – save for houses to abut Popes Lane and Lionel Road to help repay the loan.

When he opened the park on 21 March 1926, Neville Chamberlain "...rejoiced that the people had come into the possession of so magnificent and historical park..." He bemoaned the failure of earlier generations to recognise the need for open spaces in the towns and cities, when outdoor recreation was the privilege of the few.

The large mansion was converted into an exhibition space for local history and archaeology, costume and fine art as the Gunnersbury Park Museum in 1929. An adjoining area of Rothschild land just outside the Gunnersbury estate became the Gunnersbury Cemetery the same year.

The park passed to the London Borough of Hounslow in 1965 and the Gunnersbury Park Joint Committee with Ealing was set up in 1967.

=== 21st century ===
A £50 million-pound, four-year restoration was completed in June 2018 with the reopening of the large mansion. The restoration was supported by the Heritage Lottery Fund, Ealing Council and Hounslow Council and Historic England. An outdoor sporting facility was due open to the public in 2020. In July 2024, two Kunekune pigs were allowed to graze in the park to maintain shrubs and keep the grass short. It marked the first time in the park’s history that pigs were allowed to graze on the land.

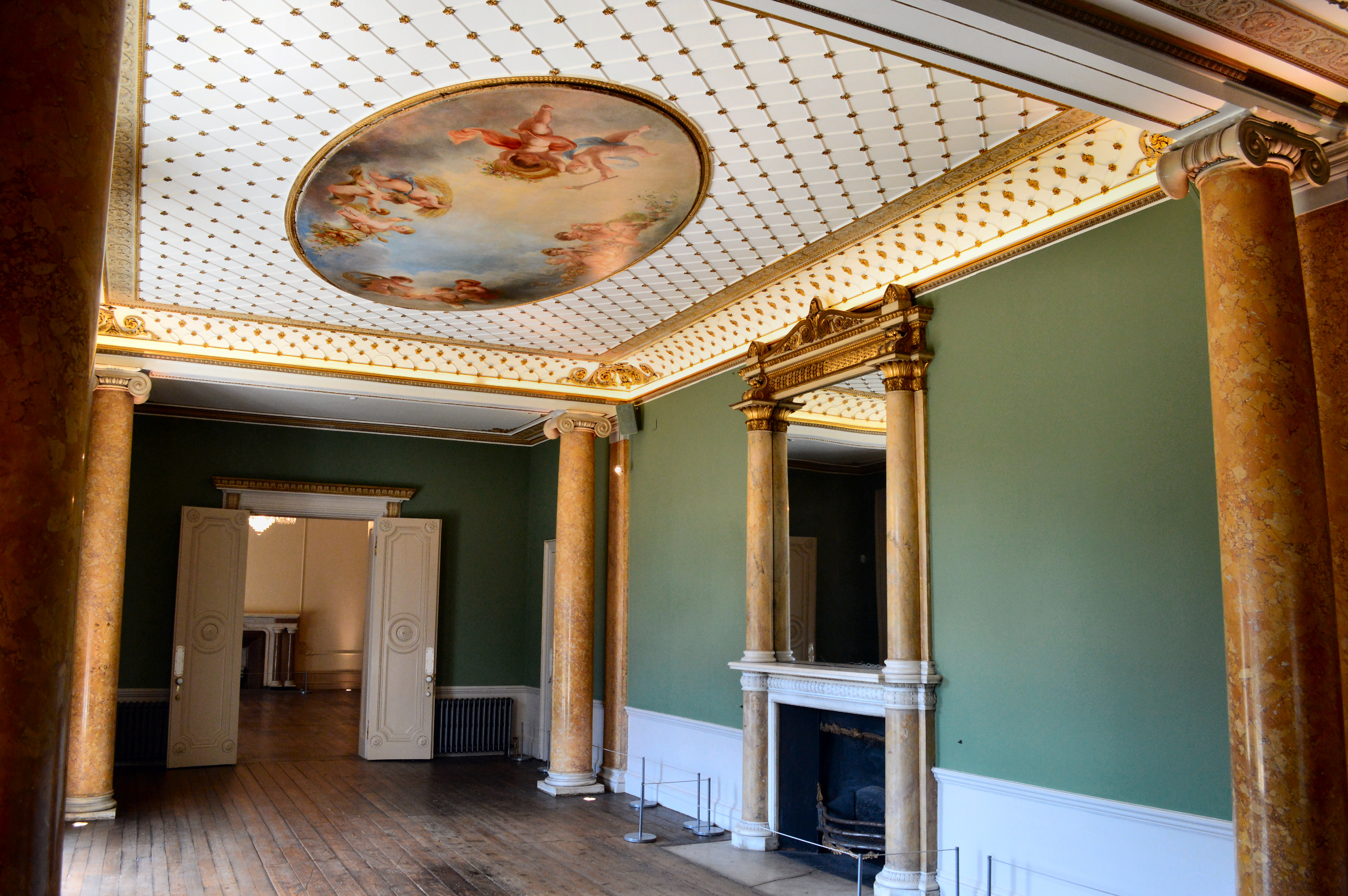
The Long Gallery after restoration

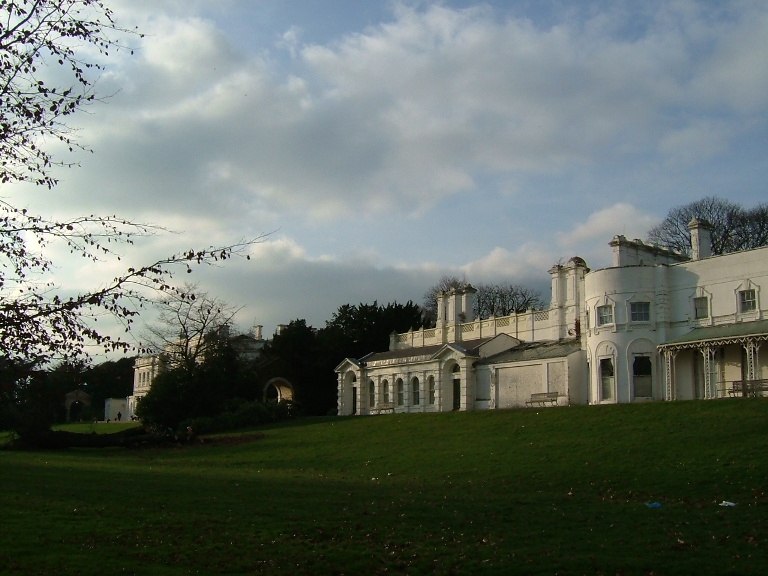
The small mansion with the large mansion in the background to the left

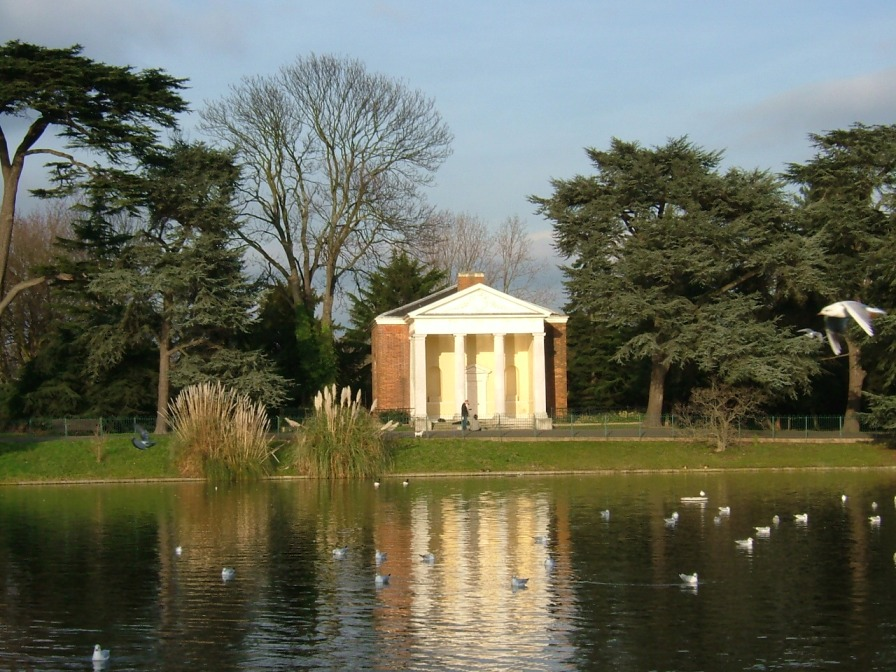
The 18th-century temple

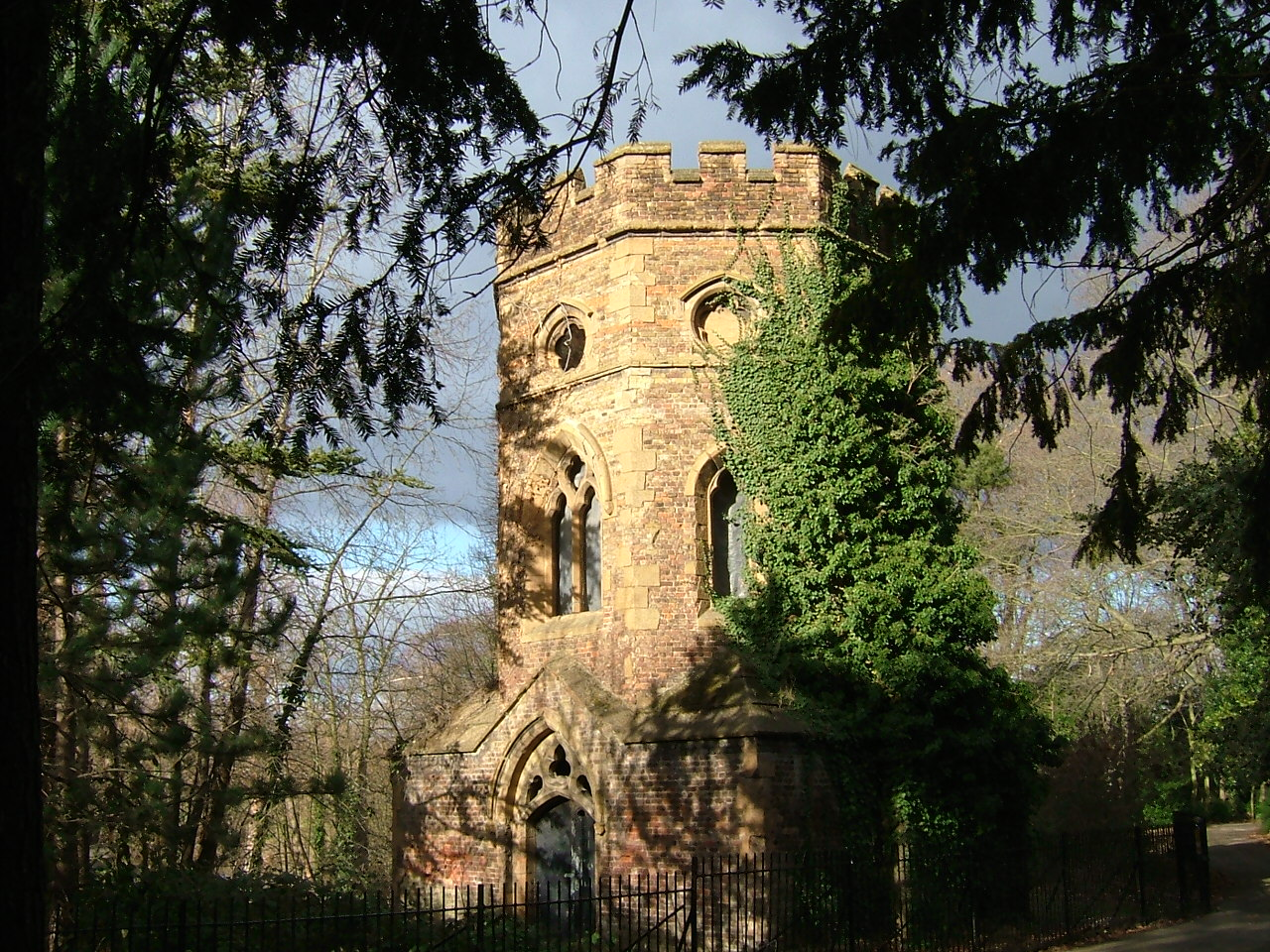
The boathouse on the Potomac

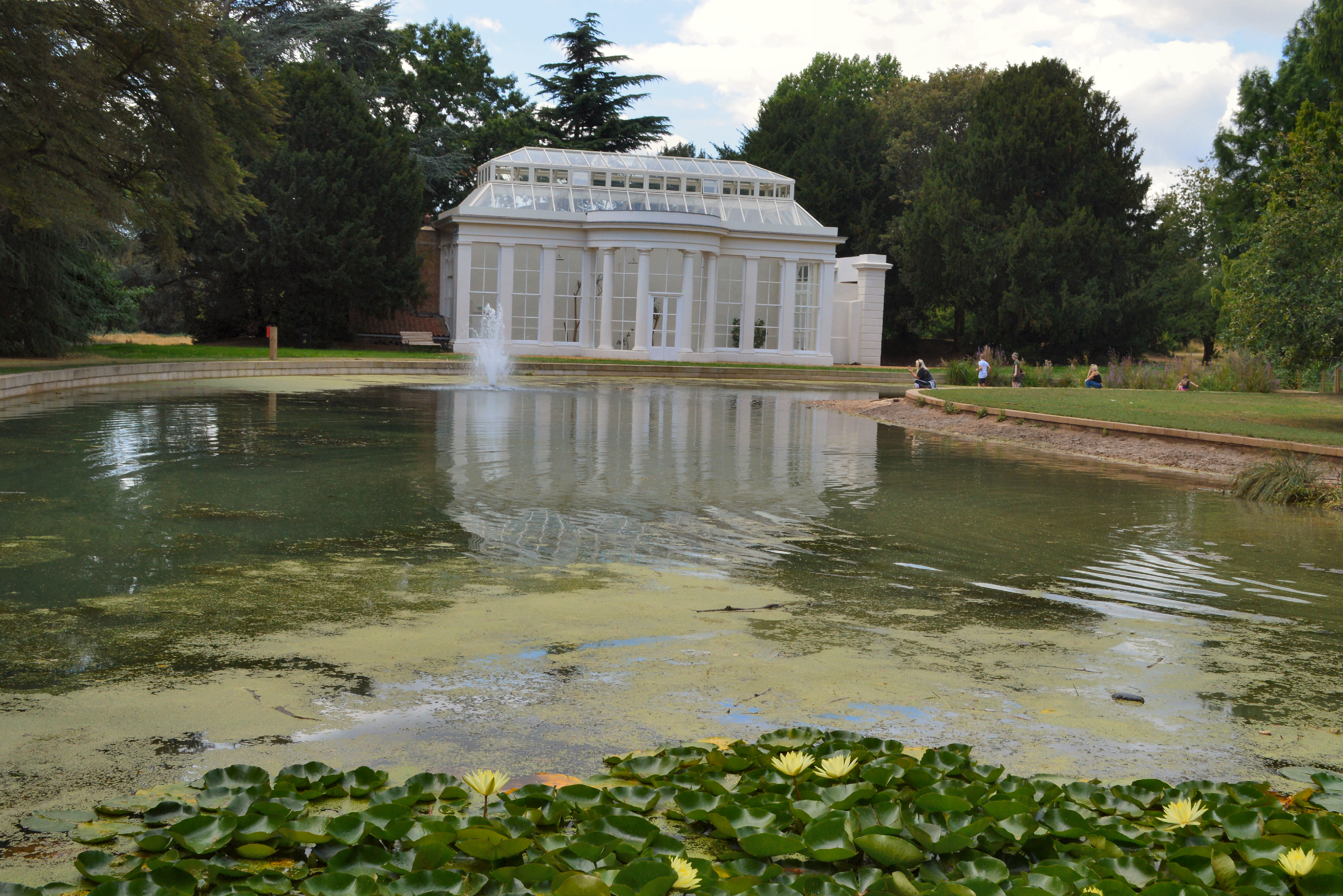
The Orangery from the Horseshoe Pond after restoration

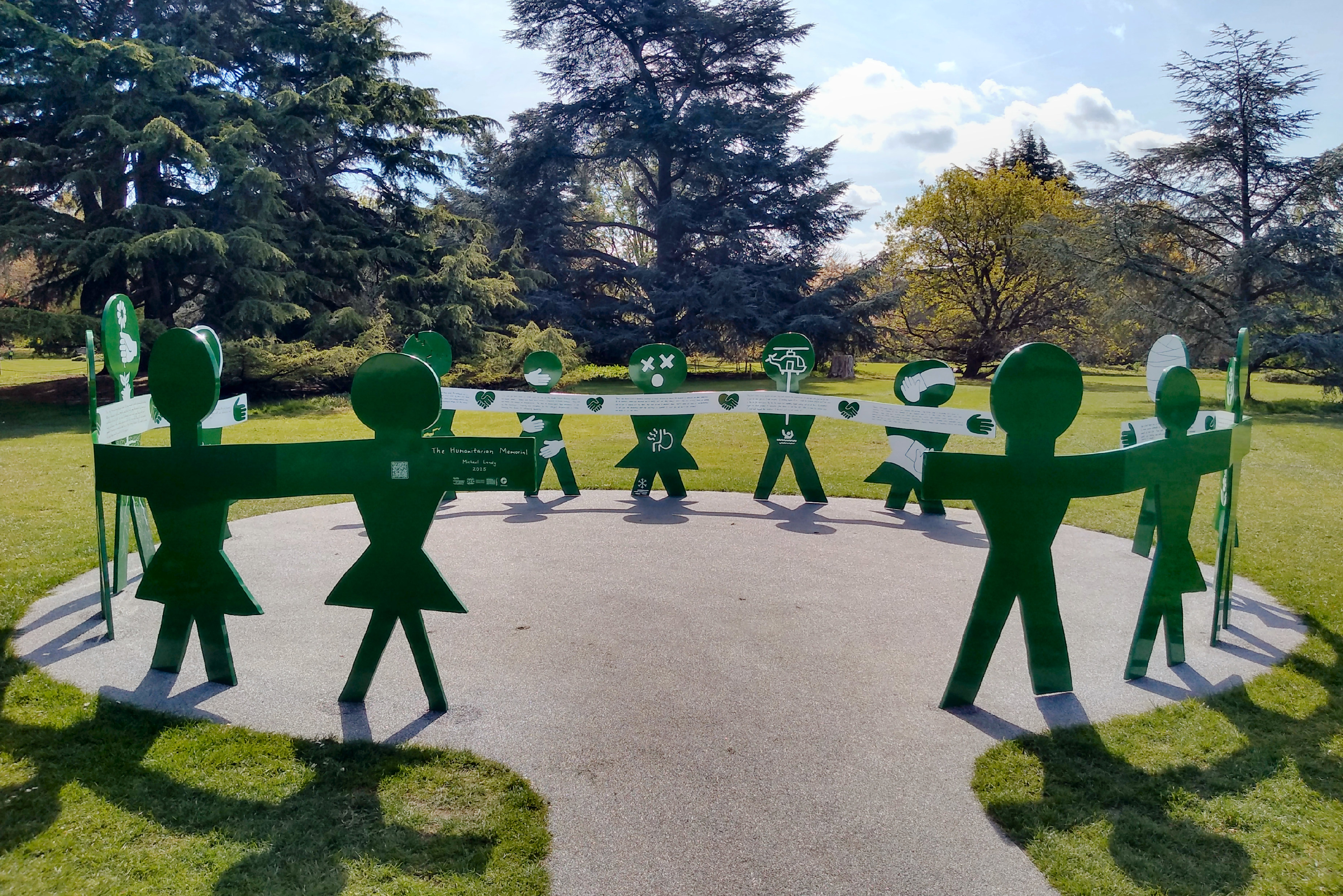
Humanitarian Memorial

The Humanitarian Memorial to killed aid workers was unveiled in the park by Prince William in 2025.

== In popular culture ==
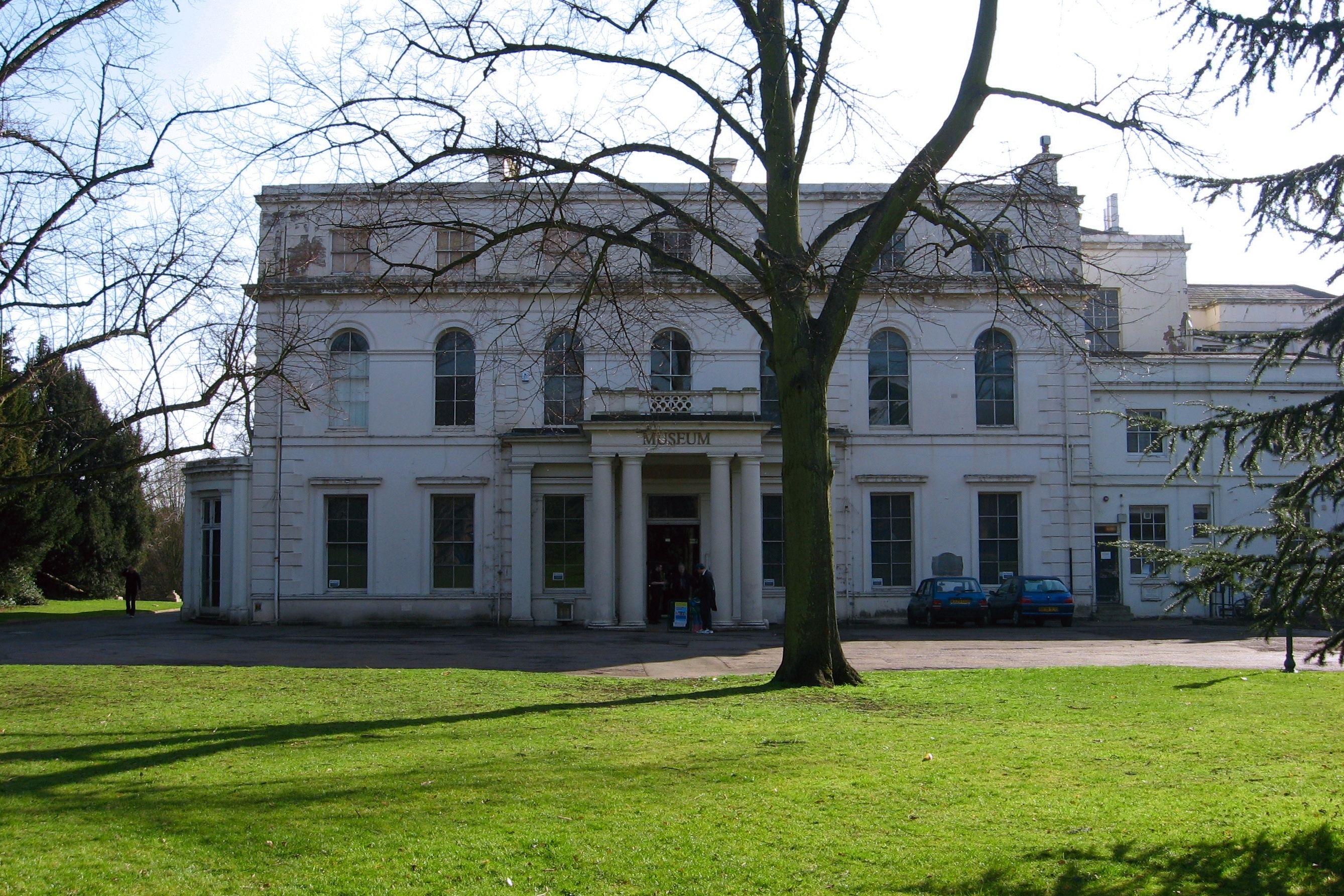
Gunnersbury Park Museum

In 1991 the London-based indie band The Hit Parade released their single "In Gunnersbury Park"; the song describes the failing relationship between songwriter Julian Henry and his girlfriend who lived a short distance from the park in Bollo Lane.

In 2020, Gunnersbury Park and its museum served as the location of the music video of Liam Gallagher's single "Once".
