= Vatche Arslanian =

Casualty of the Iraq War

Vatche Arslanian (1955 – April 8, 2003) was a member of the Canadian Red Cross and head of logistics for the International Committee of the Red Cross (ICRC) in Iraq. He was one of the six ICRC delegates who chose to stay in the country during the 2003 Iraq war and continue helping local relief workers. He was killed by gunfire in Baghdad while travelling with two local Red Cross workers, who were able to escape. Five other civilian vehicles were caught in crossfire, and thirteen people were killed in total.

Arslanian was a Canadian-Armenian citizen who emigrated from Syria. He worked for the Canadian military for a number of years and moved to Oromocto, New Brunswick when he was transferred to CFB Gagetown to serve as captain at the artillery school. He was released from service in 1995 when he refused a transfer to CFB Shilo in Manitoba. He insisted on remaining in Oromocto to continue his efforts to reunite his family.

From 1992 to 1998 Arslanian served on the Oromocto town council; he served as deputy mayor for part of this period.

In 1999, Arslanian began his association with the Red Cross. He volunteered to help at CFB Gagetown which was receiving over 1,000 Kosovar refugees. He did his first overseas work with the ICRC in 2000, when he served as a logistician in the former Soviet Union republic of Georgia.

Since July 17, 2001, Arslanian had been in charge of logistics for the ICRC in Iraq. Balthasar Staehelin, ICRC delegate-general for the Middle East and North Africa, said "the courageous decision by six ICRC expatriates to stay in Baghdad voluntarily and work alongside their local colleagues during the worst of the fighting made a marked difference to the lives of thousands of people. Arslanian was one of those six, and we can find some solace in knowing that he helped to make that difference."

== See also ==
- International Federation of Red Cross and Red Crescent Societies
- Monument to Canadian Aid Workers
