= Julian Henry =

British marketing executive

- Born: 1959 (age 66–67)
- Occupations: Marketing executive, public relations consultant, freelance writer
- Known for: Founder of Henry's House
- Relatives: B. G. Henry (father)
- Awards: Top 10 UK Marketing & PR executives (2004)

Julian Henry is a marketing executive and freelance writer based in London and Los Angeles. He has worked in PR and journalism since the 1980s. He founded the agency Henry's House in the 1990s and was appointed Head of Communication for Simon Fuller's 19 Entertainment in 2006.

== Family ==
Henry is the son of Brian Henry, a well-known figure in independent TV in London and great-nephew of Elizabeth Craig MBE, Scottish journalist, cook and author. She appeared on the 'over 90s' show on BBC TV Parkinson in 1978 aged 95 alongside Rt Honourable Manny Shinwell MP and the playwright Ben Travers CBE.

Julian Henry is a great-nephew of Arthur Mann, war correspondent for the Washington Post, New York Times and broadcaster for Mutual Broadcasting Company. Mann reported from both WW1 and WW2 bases in Europe as a contemporary of Edward Murrow and Richard Dimbleby and became a well known voice across America during the 1940s through his weekly radio reports from the London Blitz.

Henry is the brother of copywriter Susie Henry, D&AD Gold Award winner, creator of the slogan "We Won't Make A Drama Out of a Crisis" and founder of advertising agency Waldron Allen Henry & Thompson.

== Career ==
=== PR and marketing ===
Henry's first job in marketing was as a publicist in London in 1979 repping clients that included Billy Idol, Blondie, The dBs, Hazel O'Connor, Billy Bragg, Joe Jackson while pursuing a career as a songwriter and music journalist. In 1986, Henry joined fashion agency Lynne Franks and remained there ten years as she promoted the careers of Jean Paul Gaultier, Katharine Hamnett, Rifat Ozbek and other influential designers, eventually becoming Deputy Managing Director. In 1987, Henry met music manager Simon Fuller and began a working relationship that lasts to the current day; he promoted Annie Lennox solo album Diva and remains one of Fuller's closest advisers.

He became a director of Lynne Franks PR in 1991, forming a brand roster that included Absolut Vodka, Coca-Cola, BBC Radio 1, HMV Music Stores, Yamaha, Sega, The Spice Girls and TV shows including BAFTA award winning C4 show Network 7. While at LFPR, Henry co-produced two x 30 minute TV shows for BBC TV 'Yamaha Band Explosion' (BBC), which featured early performances by bands including Teenage Fanclub, Manic Street Preachers, Blur and Radiohead.

Between 1996 and 1998, Henry was a member of the Spice Girls' management team. In 1998 he launched his own PR company, Henry's House While running Henry's House, Henry ran campaigns for Tango, Big Brother, Coca-Cola, Absolut Vodka, Pop Idol and various TV shows and celebrities. In 2003 Henry began to represent David & Victoria Beckham.

In 2004, Julian Henry was listed Top 10 Marketing & PR executives in the UK and two years later he took on the role of Head of Communications at Simon Fuller's 19 Entertainment. Henry took on David and Victoria Beckham, the American Idol TV show (at the time the No.1 rated show in America) as well as corporate affairs for Simon Fuller, he orchestrated the Beckham move to LA in 2007 working from Fuller's Los Angeles office in West Hollywood. He collected 'Best Emerging Designer' Award for Victoria Beckham in London in 2011.

In 2013, Henry undertook several tours of China to promote Beckham's role as Ambassador for Chinese football. Henry is no longer involved with Henry's House; he was a Trustee of The ICA from 2001 to 2008 and writes an occasional newspaper column for The Guardian. Henry is listed No.2 in 2021 PRWeek UK Powerbook list of UK Entertainment Publicists.

=== Writing ===
In the 1980s and 1990s, Henry wrote articles and reviews for Melody Maker, NME, The Telegraph, Music Week and others; while contributing to Underground Magazine Henry unearthed Liverpool group The La's who he introduced to Go Discs chief Andy McDonald. Between 2004 and 2010, Henry wrote a column for The Guardian on Marketing and Media issues.

In 2008 and 2009, Henry wrote articles in UK press criticising the appointment of Andy Coulson as the British Prime Minister Head of Communications, and commented publicly since on the subsequent phone hacking scandal that has enveloped the British tabloids. Since 2024 Henry has written for UK media on music & entertainment.

=== Music ===
Henry has released seven LPs and several singles with his group The Hit Parade since 1985. The following decade they embarked on tours of Japan, UK, USA and released CDs that were critically applauded but never commercially successful. In the 1990s, the band recorded 'In Gunnersbury Park' for Sarah Records and have since been featured on several 'Best of 90s indie' compilations. In 2011, following the release of a new record by the Hit Parade, Guardian journalist Alexis Petridis interviewed Henry about his dual existence as PR agent and musician. Henry has been a regular spokesperson on UK popular culture.

== Selected publications ==
- One picture does not a charity campaign make (21.11.05) The Guardian.
- How tabloid editors play the publicity game (19 December 2005) The Guardian.
- These budget cuts will hit the BBC where it hurts (16.1.06) The Guardian.
- In praise of pure PR – selling to the sceptical (20.2.06) The Guardian.
- Merger gives our suburban services a Hollywood edge (3.4.06) The Guardian.
- I suspect some Arctic Monkey business (24.4.06) The Guardian.
- Is building Brand UK a mission impossible? (29.5.06) The Guardian.
- The hippest brands keep their eyes on the streets (10/7/06) The Guardian.
- The day Lord Levy showed me the truth (14/8/06) The Guardian.
- A successful formula goes up in smoke (25/09/06) The Guardian.
- The Holy Grail of eternal appeal (23/10/06) The Guardian.
- The Celebrity Untouchables (20/11/06) The Guardian.
- Big causes, celebrity effects and the real holy grail (18/12/06) The Guardian.
- Why waste money on lessons from the School of the Bleedin' Obvious? (30/04/07) The Guardian.
- Coulson's Tory Party conference test (24/09/07) The Guardian.
- Julian Henry's double life (26/05/11) The Guardian.
- https://www.standard.co.uk/comment/the-last-dinner-party-dua-lipa-raye-brit-awards-2024-b1141773.html
