= Michael Landy =

British artist

Michael Landy CBE RA
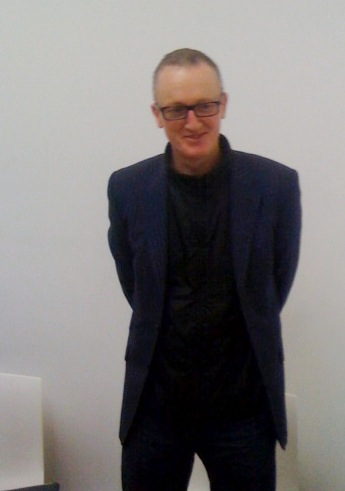
- Landy at South London Gallery in 2010
- Born: 1963 (age 62–63); London
- Education: Goldsmiths, 1985–88
- Known for: Conceptual art, installation art
- Notable work: Break Down, Art Bin
- Movement: Young British Artists

Michael Landy (born 1963) is one of the Young British Artists (YBAs). He is best known for the performance piece installation Break Down (2001), in which he destroyed all his possessions, and for the Art Bin project (2010) at the South London Gallery. On 29 May 2008, Landy was elected a member of the Royal Academy of Arts in London.

== Early life and works ==
Landy was born in London, in May 1963. He first studied art in Loughton and Loughborough, then at Goldsmiths College in London, having been inspired to take up art professionally after having a picture selected for display on the BBC television art program Take Hart.

After graduating from Goldsmiths in 1988, he exhibited in the Freeze exhibition, organised by Damien Hirst—an exhibition which first brought together a group of artists that would later become known as the Young British Artists.

In 1990, Landy exhibited in East Country Yard with several of the artists from Freeze. His first solo exhibition was Market (1990), an installation comprising numerous empty market stalls. Like much of his later work it was intended as a comment on consumerism and society.

In 1992, Landy started an association with Karsten Schubert by making Closing Down Sale for his gallery, an installation made up of a number of objects in shopping trolleys labelled "BARGAIN" and recorded announcements encouraging visitors to buy. The work was intended as a comment on the commodification of art, and might be seen as a precursor of sorts to Break Down, a work which produced no salable objects, except an edition of inventories (books) listing all destroyed items.

Before Break Down, Landy's best-known work was Scrapheap Services (1995–1996), which featured a fictitious cleaning company which sought to change society by way of "a minority of people being discarded". Promotional videos were made for the company and a large number of cut-out men were made from old magazines to be swept up and destroyed. This installation typifies the YBAs' interests in transforming the mundane into art, and recontextualisation. Its visual impact on one level is a typical industrial event, yet the gallery environment and bright red figures, along with the sinister irony of the title, is intended to force the viewer to address issues of humanity and consumerism.

Scrapheap Services, 1995.

In 1997, work which Landy had previously sold to Charles Saatchi was included in the Sensation exhibition at the Royal Academy in London. This show later toured Berlin and New York, but Landy's work was somewhat overshadowed by some of the other more outrageous artworks.

== Break Down ==
Break Down, the work which put him in the public eye, was held in February 2001 at an old branch of the clothes store C&A on Oxford Street in London (C&A had recently ceased trading, and the shop had been emptied). Landy gathered together all his possessions, ranging from postage stamps to his car, and including all his clothes and works of art by himself and others, painstakingly catalogued all 7,227 of them in detail, and then destroyed all in public. The process of destruction was done on something resembling an assembly line in a mass production factory, with ten workers reducing each item to its basic materials and then shredding them.

The exhibition was a joint commission from The Times newspaper and Artangel, and attracted around 45,000 visitors. At the end of the process all that was left was bags of rubbish, none of which was sold or exhibited in any form. An edition of inventory books listing all destroyed items was available to buy when exiting through the gift shop.

Landy made no money as a direct result of Break Down, and following it had no possessions at all.

== Later works ==
Landy made little art in the year following Break Down before returning with a solo show in late 2002, entitled Nourishment. The exhibition consisted of a series of detailed etchings of weeds, rendered in the traditional style of botanical draughtsmanship. The intricate detailing is reported to have resulted in lasting eye damage for Landy.

In 2003, Landy was selected to chair the judging panel for the Beck's Futures art prize.

In 2008, Ridinghouse published Michael Landy: Everything Must Go!, Landy's first monograph, which brings together over 20 years of the artist's work for the first time. It was in this year that Landy was elected a member of the Royal Academy.

Landy's Art Bin installation for the South London Gallery in February–March 2010 was described by the artist as "a monument to creative failure." A large transparent skip was installed at the gallery, into which he invited the public to throw art work with which they were dissatisfied. Artists and collectors were invited to apply to dispose of works of art via a dedicated website.

In 2016, Museum Tinguely Basel curated Landy's first retrospective exhibition titled "Michael Landy. Out of Order". It spanned his entire career, bringing together works from Break Down, Credit Card Destroying Machine, and Saints Alive among many others.

In 2019, Landy curated an exhibition at the Art Gallery of New South Wales, Making Art Public: 50 Years of Kaldor Public Art Projects, as part of the Kaldor Public Art Projects 50th anniversary celebrations. He created white 4x4m archive boxes, each representing one of Kaldor's previous public art projects from 1969-2019. The exhibition was held from September 2019 until February 2020.

The Contemporary Art Society Consultancy was tasked with commissioning an artist for the first global Humanitarian Memorial in Gunnersbury Park, London, and Michael Landy was unanimously chosen. The memorial was unveiled on 1st October 2025. It celebrates humanitarianism and features 15 linked steel figures displaying real personal stories.

== Personal life ==
Landy's partner is fellow British artist Gillian Wearing.

He was appointed Commander of the Order of the British Empire (CBE) in the 2021 New Year Honours for services to art.

== See also ==
- What Do Artists Do All Day?
