= Roger Took =

British art historian and sex offender

Roger Florian Took
- Born: 1944; Macclesfield, Cheshire, UK
- Died: 29 July 2011; Ealing, London, UK
- Education: Sandhurst, the Courtauld Institute
- Occupations: Art historian, curator, writer

Roger Florian Took (1944 – 29 July 2011) was a British art historian, museum curator, author and convicted child sex offender who lived in London, Ireland, and Russia. In the course of his career, he ran several museums in England, was a fellow of the Royal Geographical Society, and a former director of the Barbican Art Gallery. In 1985 he founded Artangel, an institution within the field of contemporary art. In December 2003, his book Running with Reindeer: Encounters in Russian Lapland, described life on Russia's Lapland and Kola Peninsula, and was shortlisted for the Thomas Cook Travel Book Award. Took was later recognized as an expert on the mediaeval Russian fur trade.

In April 2007, Took was arrested for paedophilia-related crimes, and in February 2008 was jailed for a minimum of four and a half years as part of an indeterminate sentence for 17 crimes relating to child abuse.

== Early life ==
Born in Macclesfield, Took was the son of George Took and his wife Paula Schischka. He was educated at Haileybury College, Sandhurst, and the Courtauld Institute.

== Career ==
=== Artangel ===
In 1985, Roger Took founded Artangel, a London-based arts organisation that commissions work ranging from sculpture to film from international artists. It was taken over by James Lingwood and Michael Morris in 1991.

=== Running with Reindeer: Encounters in Russian Lapland ===
Hardback cover

Following his departure from Artangel in 1992, Took began his trips to Kola Peninsula in Russian Lapland because there was little known about the area. He prepared by taking a crash course in Russian and getting some arms training. He studied maps and the history of the area, people and Soviet occupation. Over the years he became fluent in Russian and began to use a Cyrillic keyboard.

In December 2003, Running with Reindeer: Encounters in Russian Lapland was published in hardback. Written in a travelogue style, Took begins the book detailing the events of his first trip to Murmansk (often referred to as Russia's Lapland) as the first traveler to the area in 70 years, and later details of the interior of the region. He explains the desolation of post-Soviet north villages and the details of everyday life there of both the indigenous and non-indigenous settlers, expressing a "combination of respect and shock at their dismal lifestyle." Breaking the law, Took ventured into restricted areas, often getting caught, in order to give the reader an understanding of this vanishing native culture, its endangered ecosystem, and the dynamics of its cultures.

The Daily Telegraph reviewed the book as an "almost encyclopaedic account of northern travels". A 2004 article in the Canadian Journal of History reviewed it as "quite an extraordinary book", but continued on that "the final sections of the work prove to be ... highly disappointing." The book was shortlisted for the Thomas Cook Travel Book Award in 2004.

== Personal life ==
In 1981, Took met a painter, Pat Cleary, who was a rich divorcee with children. Their families had been associated for decades. Despite her father's concerns that the financially struggling Took was only interested in marrying his daughter for her money, the two were married on 12 July 1983 and lived in Cleary's house in Chelsea, London. The extended family from Cleary's first marriage consisted of a son and two daughters and eventually eight grandchildren. With both of Cleary's daughters in school in other countries, her teenage son was the only child residing with the couple. Cleary was "touched" by the attention paid to her son by Took, who had repeatedly made it clear that he wanted no children of his own.

The couple separated in the late 1980s as a result of Took's infidelity. They later reunited, but split again after Cleary found evidence of another affair. Although she had filed for divorce, the couple again reconciled, in part because Cleary feared her husband might commit suicide if she didn't give their marriage another chance—he had attempted suicide over rejection from a woman in his youth, leaving deep scars on his neck and wrists—and she had always considered him to be a "fragile" man. He spent much of the following years travelling in Russia.

=== Child sexual abuse case and death ===
In February 2007, his 25th year of marriage, Roger Took joined his family for a trip to the Dominican Republic. On their way home, one of his stepdaughters found a $100 bill in her daughter's luggage. The girl said that Took gave it to her so that he could photograph her. After additional questioning by her mother, she explained that she had been sexually abused by Took "for as long as she could remember". The mother alerted the police and a six-week investigation was launched, during which Took was unaware that his family knew what had been happening.

Took was arrested at Luton airport in April 2007 following a police investigation that uncovered 742 chat room logs in which Took boasted about a child rape and murder. Took denied the allegations, saying his words were merely a fantasy. Police also recovered 260 images from Took's laptop; 102 of them were subsequently graded as "level 5", meaning they depicted children being penetrated, tortured or both. Police raided Took's home where they found a locked case, which contained a large bundle of photographs of young Russian women. The women, who were naked and one of whom was having sex with Took, are believed to be prostitutes. Also found in the case were clippings of children's hair.

Took was given an indeterminate sentence by Judge Henry Blacksell QC who believed he "posed a danger to all children." He eventually pleaded guilty to a total of 17 charges, including sexual assault on a child under 13, inciting a child under 13 to engage in sexual activity, and making and possessing indecent images of children. Judge Blacksell had reviewed thousands of pages of evidence, and was visibly shocked when he told the court, "It is unrestrained filth, depravity of the worst kind." He was sentenced to nine years, but was eligible for parole after four and a half. He was also banned from working with children under the age of 18 for the rest of his life. Took appealed against his sentence.

According to Charlotte Metcalf, Took's charm, social status, academic reputation and credentials served to "cushion him from condemnation". His case received little publicity and he enjoyed support from former colleagues. During sentencing, Judge Blacksell, who stated that he had no doubt that Took suffered from an illness, took into consideration 23 letters of support and three character witnesses who spoke at the hearing on behalf of five people. He was described as a "gentle, kind, caring man who has enriched the lives of many over many years". Those who spoke were his older half-brother, John Michael Took; the Reverend Adrian Gabb-Jones; and Matteos Los, a schoolfriend from a Greek shipping family.

Took killed himself in July 2011 while on probation.

== Sources ==
- Metcalf, Charlotte (9 July 2008). "The Establishment paedophile: how a monster hid in high society". Spectator.co.uk. Archived from the original on 14 July 2008.
- "Paedophile Jailed". The Times, 16 February 2008. News in Brief, p. 4. (Archived by WebCite at)
