= Humanitarian Memorial =

Memorial in London

Coordinates: 51.499239°N 0.287770°W

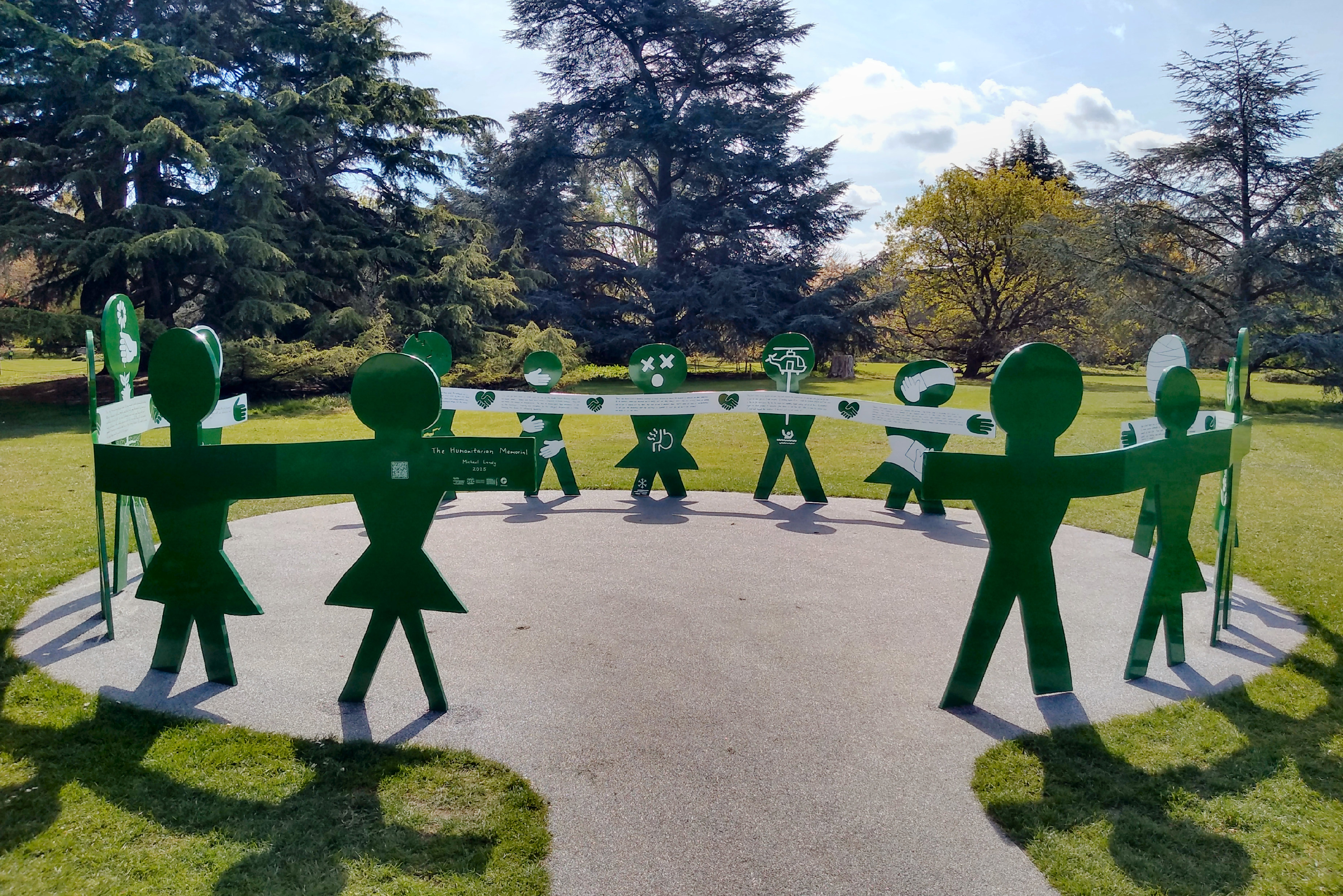
- Artist: Michael Landy
- Year: 2025
- Movement: Humanitarian Memorial Committee
- Subject: Attacks on humanitarian workers
- Location: Gunnersbury Park, London, England
- Website: https://www.visitgunnersbury.org/park/humanitarian-memorial

The Humanitarian Memorial is the world's first memorial to humanitarian workers of all nationalities who have been killed in their work. It is located in Gunnersbury Park, London.

The memorial, located near Gunnersbury Park Museum, was officially unveiled on 1 October 2025 during a ceremony that included speeches from Prince William and Tom Fletcher. Prince William formally opened the memorial.

Consultations for the proposed memorial between the park authority and local residents took place in 2023.

The memorial features fifteen human-sized figures, each inscribed with the names of humanitarian agencies, including Save the Children and Oxfam. The memorial was created by the Humanitarian Memorial Committee, chaired by John Holmes. Commissioning was overseen by the Contemporary Art Society. It was designed by the artist Michael Landy, as an immersive experience. It is his first work of art sited in a public space.

== See also ==
- Attacks on humanitarian workers
- Monument to Canadian Aid Workers
