= Creative Entrepreneurs =

Creative Entrepreneurs is an international community empowering creatives to succeed personally and professionally by providing resources for people starting up and growing creative businesses. The Creative Entrepreneurs website collects and organises business resources which can be searched by type and by specific creative sector. The website also provides magazine-like content including interviews with leading creative entrepreneurs and industry experts, such as investors and business advisors. Additionally, Creative Entrepreneurs host events to support entrepreneurship in the UK creative sector.

== History ==
Creative Entrepreneurs was launched in January 2016 at No. 10 Downing Street with four ambassadors: Anya Hindmarch, Jamal Edwards, the late Zaha Hadid and Rohan Silva. Its founder is former Time Warner executive Carolyn Dailey.

On its launch, Prime Minister David Cameron referred to the platform as "the first of its kind".
