= The Hit Parade (group) =

British indie pop band

- left-right Cath Carroll and Julian Henry.

Background information
- Origin: London, England
- Genres: Indie pop/Pop/C86
- Years active: 1984–present
- Labels: JSH Records, UK; Minty Fresh, US; Vinyl Japan, Japan; Polystar, Japan; Sarah Records, UK
- Members: Raymond Watts; Matthew Moffatt; Julian Henry; Cath Carroll; Harvey Williams
- Website: the-hit-parade.com

The Hit Parade is a music group from London that has released eight LPs and fourteen 7" vinyl records. The group has been described as "the very definition of twee Eighties style indie".

== Background ==
The Hit Parade was initially formed by three schoolfriends Julian Henry, Raymond Watts, and Matthew Moffatt. They released their first single "Forever" in 1984 by announcing that they were 'London's No.1 Pop Group'. Their second and third singles "My Favourite Girl" and "The Sun Shines in Gerrards Cross" were lauded by the pop press and played on BBC Radio 1 by DJs John Peel and Janice Long despite being recorded cheaply in the garage of the Watts family house, a studio named 'The Building Site'.

The group was later dismissed by the weekly music press as inconsequential and Watts moved to Berlin in 1989 to work with KMFDM, Henry developed a business in marketing and journalism, while Moffatt founded his own film lighting company. But The Hit Parade has continued to release new records to the present day, proclaiming the Latin motto "Semper Eadem" ("always the same").

== Recordings ==
The Hit Parade record for JSH UK record label producing 7" vinyl singles in limited editions. Their first single "Forever" was released in 1984 with a mock-vorticist manifesto. A year later The Hit Parade signed to Stiff Records but the label went out of business before anything (other than a track on a compilation album) was released. The first pressing of the band's "See You in Havana' single JSH5 with Stiff Records logo is collectible. The first Hit Parade LP With Love From The Hit Parade was released in 1988 to mixed reviews.

The album has been re-issued several times and is viewed as a 1980s indie classic. Following its release Henry was approached by Cherry Red Records and arranged nine songs on the first Would-be-goods album. In the 1990s, The Hit Parade signed to Sarah Records label and recorded "In Gunnersbury Park" b/w "Harvey".

After live shows in Japan in the 1990s the Hit Parade were linked to the Shibuya-kei movement alongside groups The Pastels, Orange Juice and Flipper's Guitar. Rockin On Magazine termed the Hit Parade 'Neo Acoustic' for its thoughtful and retrospective attitudes. The Hit Parade signed to Vinyl Japan and later Polystar Records, had a minor hit with "Hello Hannah Hello". They toured Japan several times, played at the opening of the Virgin Megastore Shinjuku, Tokyo, appearing on MTV Japan and other music TV shows, and signed to Minty Fresh Records, Chicago releasing their first US single, "Hello Hannah Hello".

The Hit Parade produced their fifth LP with St Etienne producer Ian Catt in 2006 The Return of the Hit Parade, and 9th single "My Stupid Band", the story of a failed pop group doomed to a life of obscurity. It was published with a manifesto that called for Food Lovers Fairs to be banned and for JG Ballard to be knighted. In 2007 the Hit Parade single "You Didn't Love Me Then", appeared on Sanctuary Records C86 double album Cd86: The Birth of Indie Pop.

The 10th Hit Parade 7" single was a tribute to Le Corbusier's 'Unite D'Habitation', featuring Manchester singer Cath Carroll. "I Like Bubblegum" b/w "Zennor Mermaid" raised funds for the Porthmeor Studio in St Ives Cornwall restoration fund and was voted one of the best singles of 2010 by Drowned in Sound. Julian Henry was interviewed by The Guardian in 2011.

In 2014, the Hit Parade released Cornish Pop Songs which was described by Cornishman art critic Lee Trewhela as "the best album made about Cornwall this century" and "a glorious collection of melodic, memorable guitar-based tunes". The album was re-issued on vinyl in 2016. In 2018, the Hit Parade released their 13th single "Happy World" to mark Record Store Day, described by the Arts Desk as "the very definition of twee Eighties style indie". A year later the eighth Hit Parade LP The Golden Age Of Pop was released on JSH Records and in 2022 "Pick Of The Pops" was issued on vinyl for the first time by Optic Nerve to 5* reviews in the music weeklies.

== Concerts ==
The Hit Parade first played live in 1990 at The Mean Fiddler in London before embarking the first of several UK Tours. In 1992 they toured Japan playing concerts in Shinjuku, Tokyo; they returned for four other Japan tours playing concerts in Tokyo, Osaka, Nagoya and Sendai, appearing with Billy Childish and his group the Milkshakes, and Edwyn Collins. Their line up during these tours included Mike Watts (keyboards), Harvey Williams (guitar) and Cath Carroll (vocals). Julian Henry and Harvey Williams played concerts in London and Oxford in 2009 and 2010 at the London Indiepop Festival.

In May 2014, The Hit Parade performed as a live installation of Sarah 058 at the Arnolfini Art Gallery in Bristol for the 'Between Hello & Goodbye The Secret Life of Sarah Records' exhibition.; in 2024 Julian from The Hit Parade played at the Lexington London to promote the release of a new compilation LP "Under The Bridge 2" on Skepwax Records.

== Line up ==
The Hit Parade bass guitarist, Raymond Watts, is known for his industrial group PIG, releasing seventeen albums. As well as touring North America, Japan and Europe, Watts has recorded many albums with KMFDM as Raymondo Scaballero, including writing credits on the video game and film Mortal Kombat. Since 2009, Watts has co-produced the music for Alexander McQueen's Fashion shows.

The Hit Parade's drummer, Matthew Moffatt, runs a London-based film lighting company, working with directors Mike Leigh, Kathryn Bigelow and Paul Greengrass. Moffatt is credited on several Hollywood and British produced films including the Oscar-winning Hurt Locker, and the Oscar nominated Vera Drake and United 93.

The Hit Parade's guitarist, Julian Henry, founded the public relations agency Henry's House, is a trustee of The Institute of Contemporary Arts (ICA, London), is advisor to Simon Fuller, and has written for periodicals including NME, Music Week and The Guardian on music and marketing. Other members included Cath Carroll, Harvey Williams and Mike Watts.

== Discography ==
=== Singles ===
Year	Title	Catalogue Number
1984	"Forever / Stop"	JSH 1
1984	"My Favourite Girl / It Rained on Monday Afternoon"	JSH 2
1985	"The Sun Shines in Gerrards Cross / You Hurt Me Too "	JSH 3
1985	"You Didn't Love Me Then / Huevos Mexicanos"	JSH 4
1986	"See You in Havana / Wipe Away The Tears"	JSH 5
1987	"I Get So Sentimental / Sue"	JSH 6
1991	"In Gunnersbury Park / Harvey"	SARAH 58
1994	"Autobiography / The Dispossessed, Now The Holiday's Over"	SARAH 90
2003	"In Your Arms / She Goes Down"	JSH 7
2005	"Born in St Ives / Beauty Queen"	JSH 8
2006	"My Stupid Band / Twenty Per Cent "	JSH 9
2010	"I Like Bubblegum / The Zennor Mermaid"	JSH 10
2011	"There's Something About Mary / The Boy Who Loves Brighter"	JSH 11
2017	"Oh Honey I.../ History of Art"	JSH 12
2018	"Happy World / Otaku Boy"	JSH 13
2019	"Joey's Girl / I'm Recovering From You"	JSH 14

=== Albums ===
Year	Title	Record Label
1988	With Love From The Hit Parade	JSH Records: JPEW 1
1991	More Pop Songs	Vinyl Japan
1992	Light Music	Polystar Records Japan
1994	The Sound of the Hit Parade	Polystar Records Japan
2006	The Return of the Hit Parade	JSH Records: JPEW 2
2012	Pick of the Pops Volume 1	JSH Records: JPEW 3
2014	Cornish Pop Songs	JSH Records: JPEW 4
2019	The Golden Age Of Pop	JSH Records: JPEW 5
