= Henry's House (PR firm) =

British public relations agency

Henry's House PR firm
- Industry: Public relations
- Founded: 1998
- Founders: Julian Henry, Beverley Luckings, Simon Fuller
- Headquarters: London
- Number of employees: 20

Henry's House is a London-based public relations agency founded in 1998 by Julian Henry, Beverley Luckings, and Simon Fuller. The firm became known for its work across entertainment, television programmes, media personalities, and major companies. It later rebranded as House PR.

== Background ==
The company was founded in 1998 under the name 'Henry's House' by music PR Julian Henry, Beverley Luckings, and entertainment entrepreneur Simon Fuller. The firm represented popular consumer brands, UK TV shows and celebrities, initially trading from a workshop in Acklam Road, Notting Hill, west London, from where the company was described as one of the most influential publicity firms of its time and worked on campaigns for the soft drink Tango, Victoria Beckham, S Club 7, TV presenter Jamie Theakston, David Beckham, and TV shows that included Big Brother, The Big Breakfast and Pop Idol.

== Client work ==
In 1998, The firm staged the sponsorship of London's Regent Street Lights by the drinks brand Tango, an event that featured pop group All Saints. The company quickly became well known for its work in art and pop culture and in 2002, Henry's House mounted an open air ice exhibit outside London's Design Museum for YBA Anya Gallacio to launch a new flavour of Absolut Vodka. During this period Absolut Vodka would work with members of the YBA in its advertising campaigns, including Damien Hirst. photographers Martin Parr and Pierre et Gilles, as well as staging the last photographic shoot with writer Quentin Crisp by Rankin, shortly before Crisp's death in New York. In 2009 the firm also developed and promoted a biopic on Crisp's life.

In 2000, Henry's House was taken on by Channel 4 to promote Big Brother and The Big Breakfast, and later launched Pop Idol for ITV, the show that uncovered singer Will Young and TV personality Simon Cowell. FHM, MTV, as well as others including David Beckham, and American Airlines also became the firm's clients. They won the Orange account in 2001 and spent several years promoting the telecoms sponsorship of the BAFTA Awards in London. The agency eventually parted with Orange and were recruited by Richard Branson's Virgin Mobile company. The firm held a long-term relationship with Coca-Cola in the UK. The company also held long running relationships with Virgin / NTL, for whom it promoted the V Festival each year.

Simon Fuller resigned his interest in the company in 2005 when he sold his company to become a director of CKX while founder Julian Henry stepped away from the business to work alongside Fuller in 2007. The company has since changed its name to House PR.

== Big Brother ==
In April 2001 Henry's House was appointed by Channel 4 to publicise the second season of the Endemol format Big Brother. The programme's 1st season had attracted negative comment and HH were appointed by Endemol Controller of Entertainment Ruth Wrigley, C4 Commissioning Editor Liz Warner and C4 Head of Communication Yvonne Taylor with a brief to generate Fleet Street support for the innovation around the show which included 24-hour streaming for the first time. HH won the pitch for the business by renting a townhouse next to the studio in 3 Mills where the TV show was filmed and staffing it with a team of experienced publicists working on a 24/7 rotation to provide cover for the live streaming. The publicity team consisted of Catriona Halsby, Louise Foglia, Charlotte Hickson, Loretta De Souza and Julian Henry, and their publicity work turned Big Brother into a weekly media event with regular press conferences, daily tabloid briefings and exclusive media interviews. According to The Observer, the publicity campaign for Big Brother became “the biggest story of the year, generating more coverage and selling more copies than any other subject, including the Conservative leadership election, the foot and mouth crisis and Tim Henman's Wimbledon run”. Henry's strategy of promoting a reality TV format aggressively to the tabloids has been duplicated by other UK based reality TV shows and as a result Henry's House were asked by ITV Head Of Communication Nicola Howson to launch their new format Pop Idol.
