= Break Down (Landy artwork) =

2001 artwork by Michael Landy

Break Down was an artwork created by Young British Artist Michael Landy in London in February 2001, as a reaction to the consumerist society.

The work was commissioned jointly by The Times newspaper and Artangel, as part of the Artangel Open bidding process. It was selected from 700 bids by a panel that included Brian Eno, Rachel Whiteread, Richard Cork, James Lingwood and Michael Morris. Another work was a recreation of the Battle of Orgreave by Jeremy Deller.

In February 2001, Landy gathered all his possessions at a former C&A branch at 499 Oxford Street near Marble Arch (now a branch of Primark). Over the previous three years he had catalogued all 7,227 of his possessions, from postage stamps, his passport and birth certificate, to food, clothes (including his father's 1970s sheepskin coat), works of art (including works by Tracey Emin and Damien Hirst), and his Saab 900 Turbo 16 S. The work was arranged into ten categories - artworks, clothing, equipment, furniture, kitchen, leisure, motor vehicle, perishables, reading material and studio material. They were then all destroyed in a two-week period, opened as a public exhibition. The process of destruction was like the reverse of an industrial assembly line, with items circulating in yellow trays on 160 metres (520 ft) long figure-of-eight conveyor belt. Ten workers systematically removed each item from the conveyor belt and reduced it to its basic materials by smashing, shredding and pulverising them. The work attracted around 45,000 visitors.

The resulting bags of granulated rubbish weighed nearly 6 tonnes, and were recycled or sent to landfill. None was exhibited or sold. Landy's full inventory was published as a 300-page volume, Break Down Inventory in 2002.

Following the exhibition, Landy was left with no possessions. He did not return to art for a year. In a new project in 2010, Art Bin, Landy invited members of the public to throw away works of art they disliked into a large plastic bin at the South London Gallery.
