= Monument to Canadian Aid Workers =

Coordinates: 45.442384°N 75.694948°W

- Canada
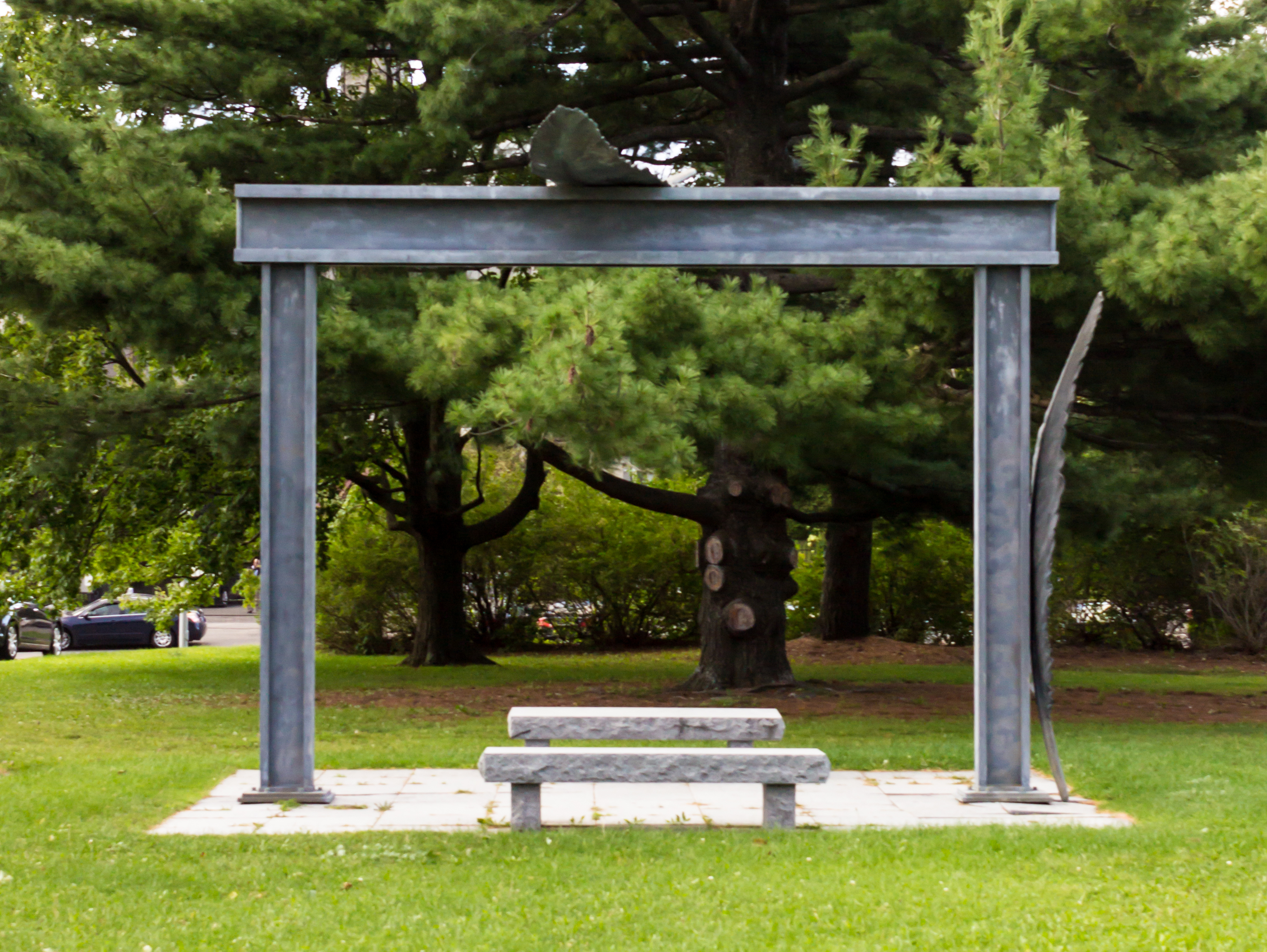
- Monument to Canadian Aid Workers, 2005
- For Canadian aid workers who have lost their lives during foreign deployments
- Unveiled: June 28, 2001
- Location: Rideau Falls Park near Ottawa, Ontario Canada
- Designed by: John Greer

The Monument to Canadian Aid Workers (French: Monument commémoratif de l'aide humanitaire canadienne) is a monument in Ottawa, Ontario, Canada. It is dedicated to Canadian aid workers who have lost their lives during foreign deployments. As a monument, it is internationally unique in its form and purpose.

== Motivation for the Monument ==
In 1996 two Canadian aid workers were killed in a short period in different incidents. Tim Stone, the executive director of the organization PATH Canada (Programme for Appropriate Technology in Health) died in the crash of hijacked Ethiopian Airlines Flight 961 on the Comoros Islands. Three weeks later 51-year-old nurse Nancy Malloy of the Canadian Red Cross and working with the International Committee of the Red Cross died in a field hospital in the Chechen city Novye Atagi near Grozny. She was murdered in her sleep along with five other colleagues by unknown assailants.

The organization PATH Canada, the Canadian Red Cross, and the Canadian Nurses Association sought a way to remember their service and began a project to realize a monument in their and other fallen aid workers' honor. The monument itself was dedicated four years later on June 28, 2001.

== Monument ==
The monument is located in Rideau Falls Park in Ottawa. It consists of a rectangular bronze arch with two bronze feathers, one on the top and the other at the side of the arch, all standing on a granite platform. There are also two granite benches where visitors can sit. The height of the monument is 3.35 metres with a base area of 4.27 x 4.88 metres.

The design was created by John Greer from Halifax, Nova Scotia who won the monument's national design competition in May 1999. His design was entitled "Reflection" which also became the name of the monument. The project was financed by a private fundraising effort and an approximately $75,000 investment by the Canadian International Development Agency.

The monument has three key messages. First, it is intended to appreciate Canada's long-standing activities in international development and humanitarian assistance; second, it honors all Canadians who died while serving in these fields abroad; third, it pays a personal tribute to Nancy Malloy and Tim Stone. Part of the project was to create a permanent list of all Canadian aid workers who have lost their lives in foreign deployments. The list currently holds 88 individuals, marking their names and dates of birth and death.

== See also ==
- Humanitarian Memorial (UK)
