= Emilia Kabakov =

Soviet-born American artist

- Эмилия Кабакова
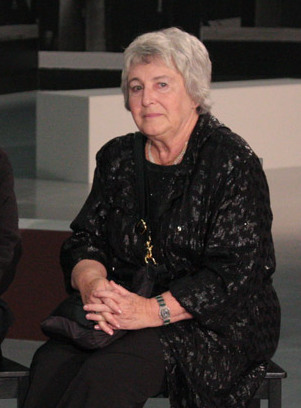
- Kabakov in 2013
- Born: Emilia Lekakh (Эмилия Григорьевна Леках); 3 December 1945; Dnepropetrovsk, USSR
- Education: Moscow University, Music College of Irkutsk
- Known for: Installation art
- Spouse: Ilya Kabakov (m. 1992; died 2023)
- Website: www.kabakov.net

Emilia Kabakov (Russian: Эмилия Григорьевна Кабакова, romanized: Emilia Grigorievna Kabakova; (Note: In this name that follows East Slavic naming customs, the patronymic is Grigorievna and the family name is Kabakova.) born 3 December 1945) is an American artist, curator and art dealer born in Dnepropetrovisk, USSR (now Dnipro, Ukraine), whose work is most closely associated with conceptualism and installation art. Since 1988, she has been frequently collaborating with her husband Ilya Kabakov. With the exception of painting, Emilia has shared the credit for all of Ilya's projects since 1997.

== Early life and education ==
Emilia Kabakov (nee Lekakh) was born in 1945 in Dnepropetrovsk, Soviet Union. She studied Spanish literature and the Spanish language at Moscow University, and piano performance at the Music College of Irkutsk.

== Biography ==
In 1973 she emigrated to Israel, after which she settled in New York City in 1975 to pursue a career as a gallerist and curator. In 1988 she began collaborating with Ilya Kabakov, who was her uncle, and later her husband. He emigrated from the USSR in 1987 to Graz and in 1988 relocated to New York.

== Work ==
Her work has been exhibited at the Tate Modern, the 1993 Venice Biennale, where they represented Russia, the Hirshhorn Museum, the Irish Museum of Modern Art, among many other museum venues. In 2014 Emilia Kabakov was awarded the Commandeur l’Ordre des Arts et des Lettres by the Ministery de la Culture of France, in recognition of her contributions to contemporary art. In 2000, the Kabakovs were commissioned by the Public Art Fund to create a major installation, The Palace of Projects, at the 69th Regiment Armory in New York City consisting of 65 separate projects within a large spiral configuration 80 feet in diameter by 40 feet high.

== Collections ==
Kabakov's work is included in the permanent collections of the Museum of Contemporary Art Antwerp, the British Museum, among others.
