= Ron Shuebrook =

Canadian artist (born 1943)

- Born: Ronald Lee Shuebrook; 1943 (age 82–83); Fort Monroe, Virginia, U.S.
- Education: Kent State University, Ohio as a painting major with minors in sculpture and printmaking and took additional coursework in art history (1970–1972); he received his MFA in 1972

Ron Shuebrook RCA (born 1943) is an American-born Canadian abstract artist living in Guelph, Ontario. He is a prominent teacher and administrator, as well as a writer.

== Career ==
Shuebrook studied at Kutztown State College, Pennsylvania, US, where he received his BS and M.Ed. in art education. During the summers of 1965 and 1967, he attended the Haystack Mountain School of Crafts, Deer Isle, Maine. There he received painting and printmaking scholarships and his mentor was Peter Gee, among others. Afterwards, he attended the Fine Arts Work Center, Provincetown, Massachusetts, studying with Fritz Bultman, as well as with visiting artists Robert Motherwell, Allan Kaprow and others (1969–1970). He attended the Blossom-Kent Summer Program (1971) on a painting scholarship with visiting artists Leon Golub, R.B. Kitaj, Otto Piene, and with Kent State University faculty. He then attended Kent State University, Ohio, as a painting major with minors in sculpture and printmaking and took additional coursework in art history (1970–1972); he received his MFA in 1972.

He came to Canada in 1972, where he joined the Art Department of the University of Saskatchewan at Saskatoon, as an instructor. He coordinated a summer programme at Emma Lake, Saskatchewan, teaching drawing and painting with visiting artists including Greg Curnoe, Russ Yuristy, Doug Haynes, and Karen Wilkin. In 1973, he moved to Acadia University, Wolfville, Nova Scotia, where was a lecturer (1973–1976), then assistant professor (1976–1977).

In 1977, he joined the staff of NSCAD, Halifax as visiting instructor of painting and of the Advanced Studio. From 1977 to 1979, he was on the Faculty of Fine Arts at York University as visiting assistant professor (1977) and was promoted to associate professor in 1978. In 1979, he returned to NSCAD as an associate professor. He was appointed chairman of the Studio Division in 1980. In 1984, he became coordinator of drawing and foundation art of the Studio Division at NSCAD. In 1987, he became executive director of the Ottawa School of Art. He became a professor of drawing and painting at the University of Guelph (1988–1999), and chairman of the Fine Arts Department. At OCAD University in Toronto, he served as a professor of painting and drawing (1999–2009), and president in 2000. In 2008, he received the honour of professor emeritus, OCAD University, Toronto, Ontario.

Ron Shuebrook currently lives in Guelph, Ontario, and Blandford, Nova Scotia.

== Work ==
Shuebrook had teachers who were part of the first generation of Abstract Expressionism. His own work has been described as geometric abstraction. His canvases are formally organized and evoke associations with architecture and landscape without literal description. The works explore the sweep of the artist's hand in relation to the rectangle of the surface. One critic believes they are related to Constructivism and to Matisse. He makes his drawings by marking and erasing shapes and lines.

He has exhibited his work in many shows nationally and internationally. In 2014–2015, his exhibition titled Ron Shuebrook: Drawings organized and circulated by the Thames Art Gallery in Chatham, Ontario and curated by John Kissick, travelled nationally in collaboration with the Robert McLaughlin Gallery in Oshawa, the Art Gallery of Guelph, the Mount Saint Vincent University Art Gallery in Halifax, and the Kelowna Art Gallery. In 2024, an exhibition of five decades of work, titled Ron Shuebrook: Selected Works - Five Decades was shown at the Elora Centre for the Arts.

Shuebrook's paintings, drawings, prints, and wall constructions have been acquired by more than 50 public galleries, museums, and corporations such as the National Gallery of Canada, the Art Gallery of Ontario, Art Gallery of Hamilton, Art Gallery of Guelph, Beaverbrook Art Gallery, the Art Gallery of Nova Scotia, and many others. He was the President of the Royal Canadian Academy of Arts from 2006 to 2007. In Toronto, he has been represented by Olga Korper Gallery since 1987.

== Bibliography ==
- Nasgaard, Roald (2008). Abstract Painting in Canada. Douglas & McIntyre. ISBN 9781553653943.
