= Carolyn Dailey =

American lawyer

- Born: 1959 (age 66–67); San Francisco, California, U.S.
- Education: University of California, Los Angeles (BA)
- Occupations: Author, The Creative Entrepreneur, DK Penguin Random House; Founder, Creative Entrepreneurs
- Known for: Former Europe chief of Time Warner

Carolyn Dailey is a British-American author, commentator and entrepreneur. Based in London, she was formerly Time Warner's top executive in Europe. In 2025 she released her first book, The Creative Entrepreneur, published by DK Penguin Random House. In 2016, she launched Creative Entrepreneurs, a membership-based learning and networking platform to help creative people build successful businesses in the creative industries.

== Career ==
=== Author, The Creative Entrepreneur ===
In 2025, Dailey released her debut book, The Creative Entrepreneur, published by DK Penguin Random House. It is a guide on how to build a creative business from ten leading creative entrepreneurs across music, film, fashion, design, art, cuisine and videogames, including multi-award-winning musician Nile Rodgers, multi-emmy-winning producer of The Crown Andy Harries and founder of London’s River Cafe, Ruthie Rogers. It also includes summaries of business advice on key topics people building creative careers and businesses need to know about, such a Marketing, Business Plans and Intellectual Property.

=== Creative Entrepreneurs ===
In January 2016, Dailey launched Creative Entrepreneurs, a movement to inspire and resource entrepreneurs in the creative industries, at No.10 Downing Street, with the support of the Prime Minister David Cameron who declared the initiative "the first of its kind" and Minister of State for Culture and the Digital Economy, Ed Vaizey. A learning and networking platform, Creative Entrepreneurs offers events with high-profile creative founders such as Charlotte Tilbury, ustwo Co-Founder Mills Miller, fashion designer Roksanda Ilincic, Founder of AKQA Ajaz Ahmed, Co-Founder of Frieze, Matthew Slotover and Founder of IMDb, Col Needham. It also offers training courses in partnership with London's Design Museum, and has attracted creative heavyweights, Zaha Hadid, Anya Hindmarch, Jamal Edwards and Rohan Silva as ambassadors.

Online, Creative Entrepreneurs offers searchable curated business resources and also produces original content including Masterclasses with leading experts, inspirational interviews with creative entrepreneur role models and advice pieces from industry experts and investors, big picture think pieces from respected journalists and economic experts and coverage of the major news stories impacting creative entrepreneurship.

=== Time Warner (Now Warner Bros. Discovery) ===
Dailey was at Time Warner for over 20 years where she served most recently as Time Warner’s top executive in Europe until her departure to subsequently found Creative Entrepreneurs. At Time Warner she worked with successive chairmen, CEO's and senior management of Time Warner and divisions HBO, CNN, Warner Bros. and Time Inc. to enter new markets, maximise brand value and establish thought leadership with industry, political, media and creative leaders crucial to Time Warner's success. Dailey originally joined Time Warner with CNN in London as a member of founder Ted Turner's small start-up team that launched CNN in Europe.

=== Early career ===
Starting her career as an M&A lawyer for global law firm White & Case in New York and London, Dailey was previously on staff at the US Congress then held a communications post at Estée Lauder Companies in Paris. From 1990 to 1994 she served as a European Counsel for CNN.

During 2011 to 2019, Daily was the principal stakeholder of The Dailey Partnership Ltd. (formerly Dailey Communications Limited), an advertising agency.

=== Other Activities ===
Dailey appears regularly on Sky News as an expert on the creative industries and, in 2018, was named to Creative Review's annual "Creative Leaders 50" list, as one of the 50 people driving change in the global creative industry.

Dailey is a Life Member of British Academy of Film and Television Arts (BAFTA) and a Founding Member of Annie Lennox's global women's empowerment charity The Circle. She has been named by Wired UK, in 2010, as one of the UK's "Top 10 Women Digital Powerbrokers" and by the London Evening Standard as one of the 1000 most influential Londoners, each year from 2013 through 2016.

== Education ==
Dailey has a BA with Honours in Art History from UCLA and obtained the Advanced Programme in French Language and Civilisation at the Sorbonne.
