= Ilya Kabakov =

Ukrainian-American conceptual artist (1933–2023)

- Илья Кабаков
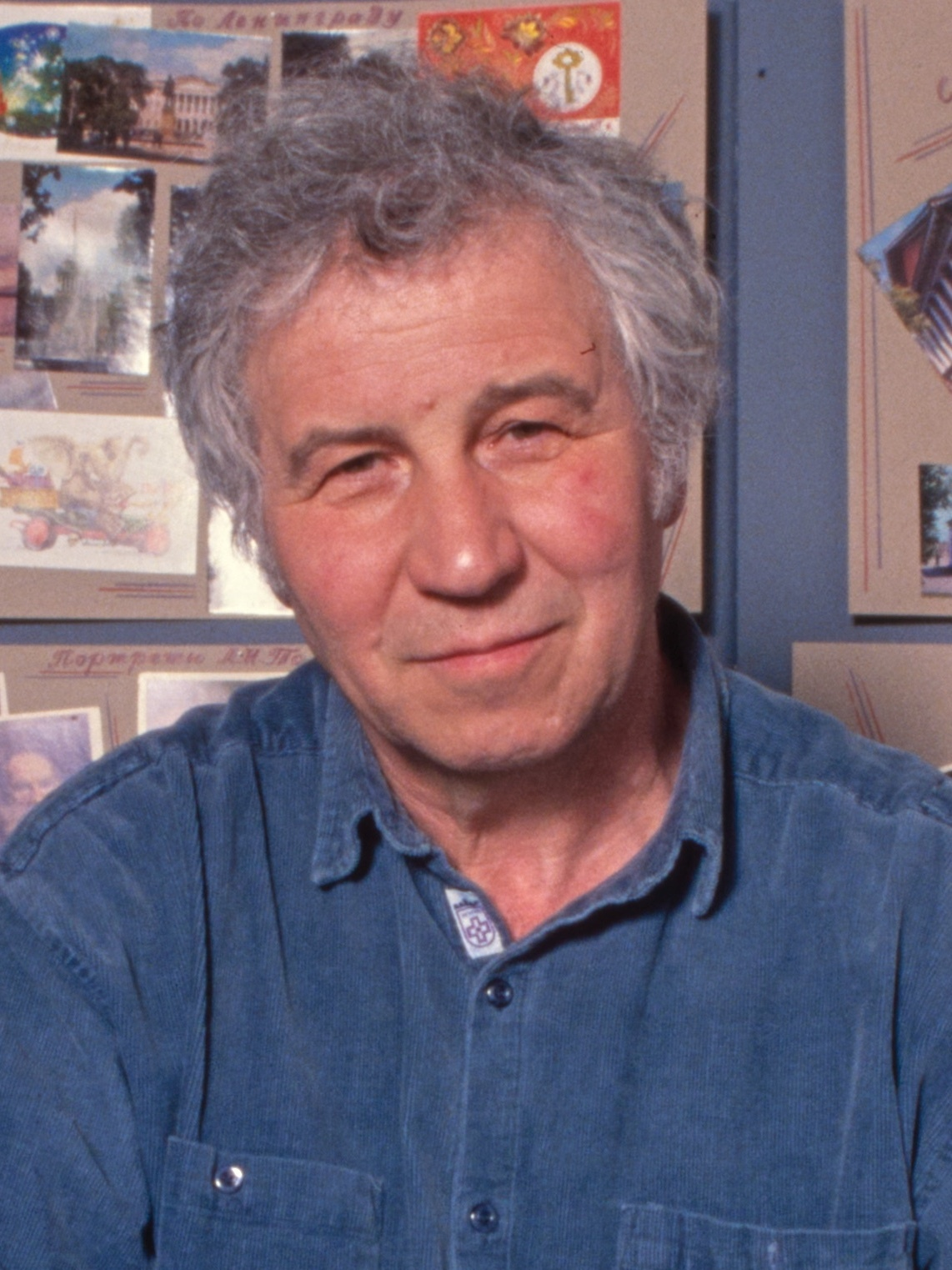
- Kabakov in 1988
- Born: September 30, 1933; Dnipropetrovsk, Ukrainian SSR, Soviet Union
- Died: May 27, 2023 (aged 89); New York, U.S.
- Known for: Installation art
- Spouse: Emilia Kabakov (m. 1992)
- Awards: Praemium Imperiale (2008)
- Website: www.kabakov.net

Ilya Iosifovich Kabakov (Ukrainian: Ілля Йосипович Кабаков, romanized: Illia Yosypovych Kabakov; Russian: Илья Иосифович Кабаков; September 30, 1933 – May 27, 2023) was an American and Soviet conceptual artist, born in Dnipropetrovsk in what was then the Ukrainian SSR of the Soviet Union, now Ukraine. He worked for thirty years in Moscow, from the 1950s until the late 1980s. After emigrating to the United States he lived and worked on Long Island.

== Early life ==
Ilya Iosifovich Kabakov was born on September 30, 1933, in Dnipropetrovsk. His mother, accountant Bertha Judelevna Solodukhina, and his father, locksmith Iosif Bentcionovitch Kabakov, were Jewish. Ilya was evacuated during World War II to Samarkand with his parents. There he started attending the school of the Leningrad Academy of Art. His classmates included the painter Mikhail Turovsky. At 18, he moved to Moscow to attend the Surikov Art Institute, where he graduated with a specialty in graphic design and book illustration.

== Career ==
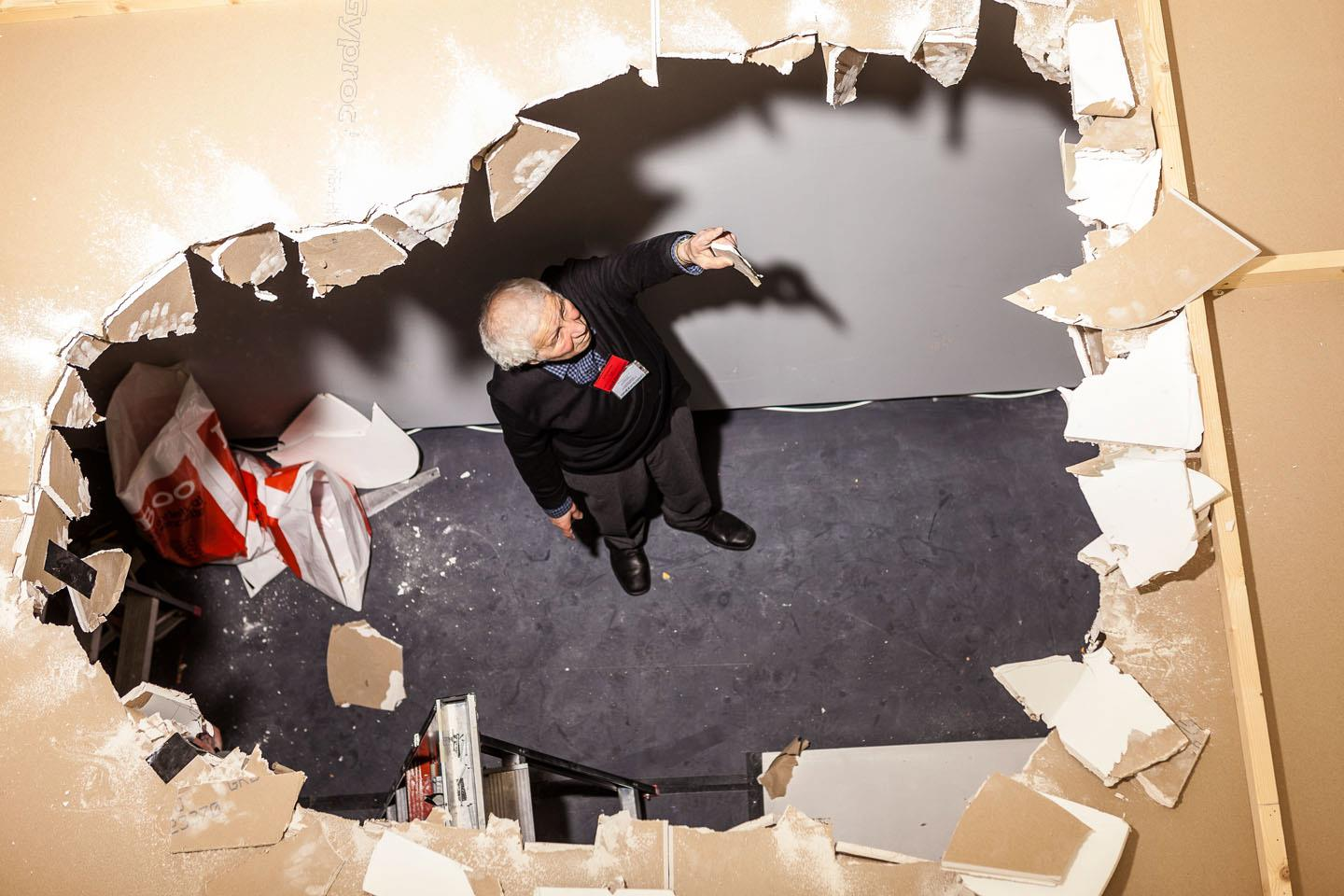
Kabakov gives instructions for the installation "The Man Who will Fly into Space From His Apartment" in 2016

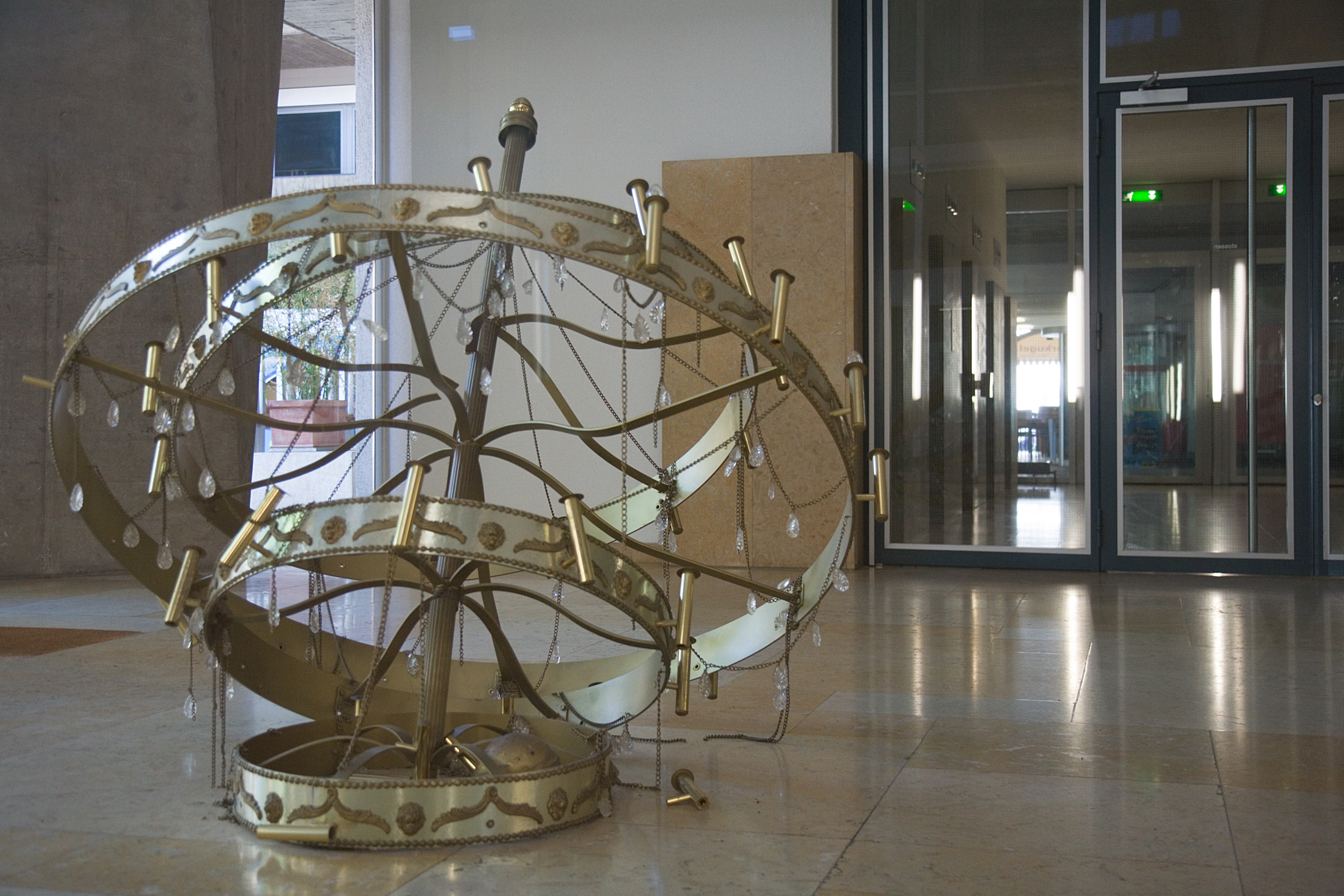
The fallen Chandelier in Zürich

Unlike many underground Soviet artists, Kabakov joined the Union of Soviet Artists in 1959 and became a full member in 1962. This was a prestigious position in the USSR and it brought with it substantial material benefits. In general, Kabakov illustrated children's books for 3 to 6 months a year and then spent the remainder of his time on his own projects.

In the art scene of 1970s Moscow, Ilya Kabakov's talent found a champion in Dina Vierny, a gallerist. Vierny, after a visit in Moscow in the early 1970s, committed to supporting artists resisting the constraints of socialist realism, discovered Kabakov. The meeting occurred on the evening of January 16, 1970, when Vierny recognized and appreciated Kabakov as an artist of originality, despite being unknown and prohibited from exhibiting in Moscow. Vierny's interest in Kabakov's work endured for over 27 years. Despite Kabakov's infrequent exhibitions in Moscow, his drawings captivated international audiences. Vierny encouraged Kabakov to leave the Soviet Union for broader recognition, and supported him by acquiring a substantial number of his works. This support was not limited to Kabakov alone; Vierny, upon her return, brought back works by other non-conformist artists such as Erik Boulatov and Vladimir Yankilevsky, known as the Group of Boulevard Sretensky. Together, these artists, despite differing styles, shared a common struggle against state-imposed artistic limitations, particularly the constraints of socialist realism. Vierny's commitment culminated in the exhibition "Russian Avant-Garde - Moscow 1973" at her Saint-Germain-des-Prés gallery, showcasing the diverse yet united front of non-conformist artists challenging the artistic norms of their time.

Between 1983 and 2000, Kabakov created 155 installations. Of these, one of the best known installations is The Man Who Flew Into Space From His Apartment. First created in 1985 in a secret attic studio in Moscow, Kabakov later recreated the piece in the United States at Ronald Feldman Gallery in 1988. The installation portrays a small, run-down bedroom with a large hole in the ceiling and propaganda photos covering the walls. The exhibition was widely reviewed, securing Kabakov's reputation in the New York art world.

== Personal life and death ==
Kabakov emigrated to Austria in 1987, then the United States in 1988, following the gradual exhibition of his works in the West. A year after arriving in New York, he met curator and dealer Emilia Kanevsky, who was also his niece; they married in 1992. For three decades, the couple collaborated on numerous exhibitions, including Documenta in 1992, the Venice Biennale in 1993, the Whitney Biennial in 1997, the State Hermitage Museum in St. Petersburg in 2004, and the Tate Modern and the Hirshhorn in 2017.

Kabakov died on May 27, 2023, at the age of 89. He had one daughter and four grandchildren.

== Exhibitions and collectors ==
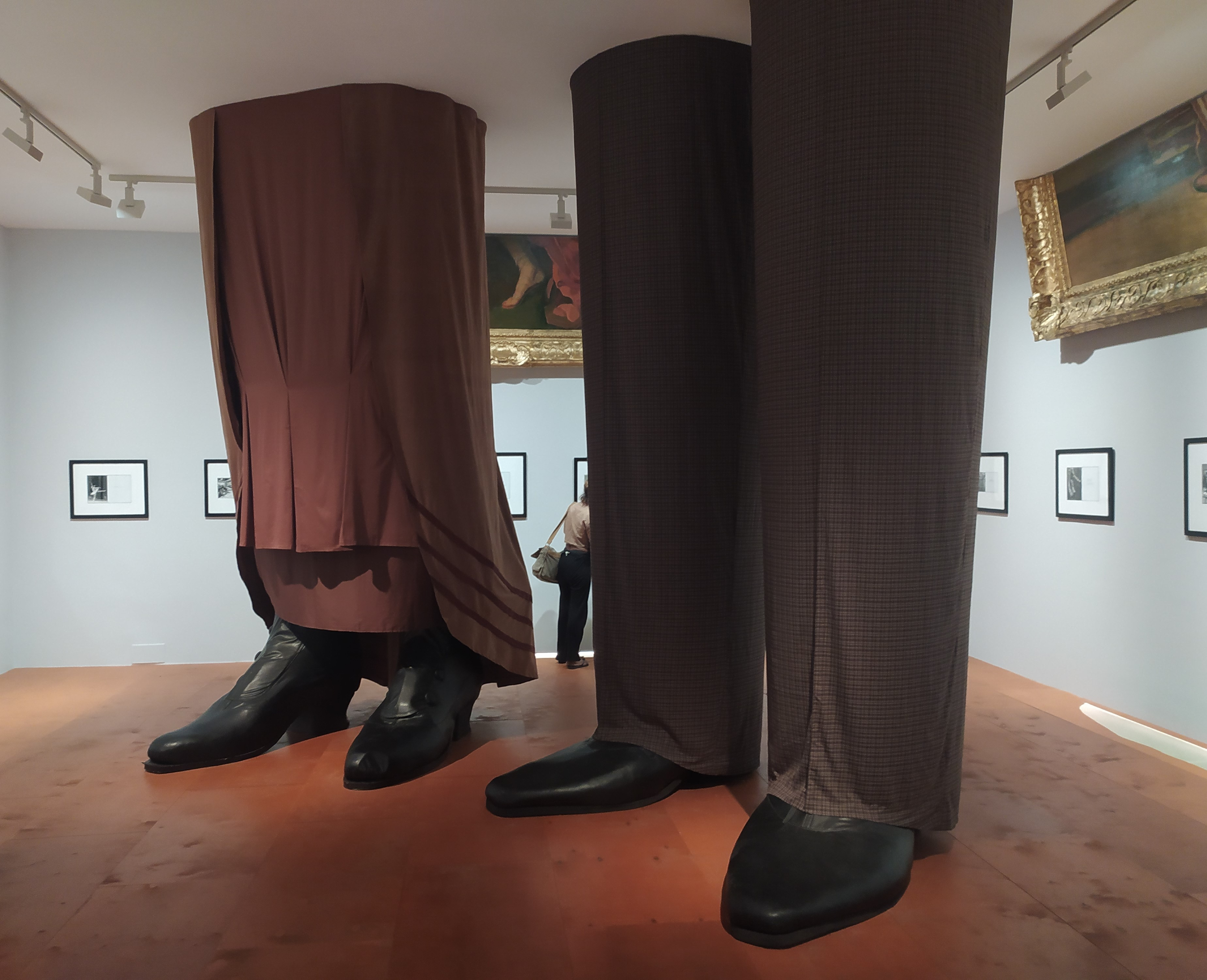
"Tomorrow We Fly", exhibition in the Tel Aviv Museum of Art, 2023

Following Mikhail Chemiakin's 1995 show, Ilya Kabakov had one of the first major solo exhibitions of a living Russian artist at the new State Hermitage Museum in St. Petersburg in 2004.

His works are included in the collections of the Zimmerli Art Museum, the Centre Pompidou, Museum of Modern Art, Guggenheim Museum, The Hermitage, Tretjakov Gallery, Norway Museum Of Contemporary Art, the Kolodzei Art Foundation and various international institutions.

In 2017, the Tate Modern in London exhibited Ilya and Emilia Kabakov: Not Everyone Will Be Taken Into the Future and the Hirshhorn Museum in Washington, D.C. set up an exhibition Ilya and Emilia Kabakov: The Utopian Projects.

National Museum of Norway (Norway) has "Søppelmannen" ['the garbage man'] on permanent display.

== Books ==
- Kabakov, Ilya. 5 Albums, Helsinki: The Museum of Contemporary Art and the National Museum of Contemporary Art, Oslo. Helsinki: ARTPRINT, 1994. ISBN 951-47-8835-4
- Kabakov, Ilya. The Communal Kitchen, Paris: Musee Maillol, 1994.
- Kabakov, Ilya. 10 Characters, New York: Ronald Feldman Fine Arts, 1988.
- Kabakov, Ilya. Ilya Kabakov on Ulo Sooster's Paintings: Subjective Notes, Tallinn: "Kunst" publishing house, 1996.
- Kabakov, Ilya and Vladimir Tarasov. Red Pavilion, Venice Biennale Venice: Venice Biennale, 1993.
- Kabakov, Ilya. Life of Flies, Koln: Edition Cantz, 1992.
- Kabakov et al. Ilya Kabakov: Public Projects or the Spirit of a Place, Milan: Charta, 2001, ISBN 88-8158-302-X.
- Kabakov, Ilya; Osaka, Eriko ed. Life and Creativity of Charles Rosenthal (1898–1933), Contemporary Art Center: Art Tower Mito, Japan, 1999, 2 volumes.

== See also ==
- List of Russian artists
- Moscow Conceptualism
- Irina Nakhova
