= B. G. Henry =

Brian Glynn Henry (1926–2003) was a figure in TV and newspaper advertising in the UK in the 1950s and 1960s.

== Early life ==
Brian Glynn Henry was born in February 1926 in Liverpool and was educated at Stowe School under J. F. Roxburgh from September 1940 to April 1944 where he obtained School and Higher Certificates, and later at Trinity College, Cambridge where he obtained an Honours Degree in English.

During the World War II Brian Henry served in the Navy. First as a rating in home waters, and later, after he was commissioned, as a Sub-Lieutenant, RNVR, in the Far East including eight months service as First Lieutenant from 1943 to 1947 in the 273rd Infantry Landing Craft Flotilla.

In 1946, aged 20, he navigated one of HM ships over 10,000 miles from Plymouth to the Philippines. Later, from February to September 1948, Henry served under Lieutenant-Commander HGV Meller, Assistant Secretary to the Commander in Chief of the Home Fleet.

He returned to Cambridge to complete his course and then took his first jobs as a temporary assistant in London University Library, St Marylebone Borough Library in London and at AC Nielsen Marketing Research Organisation in Oxford.

== Media career ==
In February 1949 Brian Henry was offered a job in the Advertisement Department of The Star, London's leading evening paper, selling space for Classified Advertisements at a wage of £7 per week. It was a career he took to immediately. He wrote to the Secretary of the Cambridge University Appointments Board in May 1949:

"It seems strange that I should have been looking for almost any job in which selling was not required and then should have found this one so much to my liking. In actual fact, what I am doing now is selling, and, moreover, selling the most difficult commodity of all, namely, advertising space. To my surprise it suits me splendidly, which goes to show, I suppose, that you never know what you can do until you try".

In May 1949 he was transferred to display advertising, where he took over responsibility for all client work in the area of TV, radio, electrical as well as advertising agencies and publishers. Within two years, aged 25, he had become the youngest Advertisement Manager in Fleet Street with 65 people under his control.

In May 1955 he achieved the papers highest ever advertisement revenue (over £2,000,000). He was being paid £1,560 pa. In 1956 he entered the TV industry almost 1 year after the launch of ITV in September 1955. It was a seminal time for the TV and advertising industries. Under 1 million people had TV sets, and broadcasts were limited to specific areas of the country in black and white, and for under 30 hours a week.

BG Henry became Controller of Advertisements at Associated-Rediffusion Ltd, the London weekday station, and the largest and most important television company in the ITV network. Over the next four years the industry expanded quickly as TV took off. By 1960 over 8 million homes had televisions and advertising on TV had become the most powerful media in the UK with over £1 million spent on advertising new products each week. Brian Henry was one of the most powerful men in the industry.

On 21 June 1961, after a year making a record breaking profit of £8,000,000 for Rediffusion, Brian Henry was invited by John Davis, chairman of the Rank Organisation, to join the board of Southern Television. He remained at Southern TV until 1969 when he was invited by Marmaduke Hussey to join Lord Rothemere's Harmsworth Publications Ltd (the national newspaper subsidiary of the Associated Newspapers Group), owners of the Daily Mail. His salary was £13,500 pa, he had annual expenses of £1,500, a full-time secretary, chauffeur, houses in Eaton Square and in Chilbolton Hampshire, a Rambler Ambassador and various other perks.

However the move was not successful. Duke Hussey left Associated Newspapers in 1970 and was replaced by Mick Shields amid a backdrop of lost revenues and strikes. Speculation followed concerning the closure of the papers. On 8 March 1971 the Daily Sketch closed with the loss of 1,700 people. In the re-organisation Brian Henry became Director of Marketing and successfully launched the new 'tabloid' Daily Mail before resigning in December 1971 to re-join Southern TV.

He remained at Southern TV until the station lost its license to TVS in 1980. In 1984 Brian Henry completed work on his book "British Television Advertising: The First 30 Years", which has since become a popular reference for modern media historians.

Brian Henry was a Fellow of The Institute of Marketing, The Chairman of The Oxford Playhouse, Trustee of the Bournemough Symphony Orchestra, Founder and Chairman of the Cambridge Society (Berks Branch), Vice Chairman of the Campaign for Rural England and for 36 years he was Governor of Bournemouth & Poole College of Art and Design.

== Personal life ==
Brian Glynn Henry was one of two sons Glynn Henry (1893–1979), a senior executive and director of healthcare company Johnson & Johnson, and later Beechams, from 1929 to 1949. Glynn Henry was well known in Cookham Berkshire during the 1950s and 1969s where he owned the chemist shop on the High Street for over twenty years, 'The Old Apothecary'. The artist Stanley Spencer was a famous client of the shop. Brian Henry's brother Hugh Henry became director of Scottish Television.

Brian Henry was married twice, firstly to Elizabeth Craig and later to Jan Barney, and had four children, Susan, Louise, Julian and Deborah.

== Publications ==
- British Television Advertising: The First 30 Years, by Brian Henry (Century Benham Ltd, 1986).

== Appendix ==
Details of ships served on by BG Henry in the 2nd World War:

- HMS Ganges 26 October 1943
- HMS Ganges 4 October 1944 to 25 November 1944
- HMS Dauntless 26 November 1944 to 19 January 1945
- HMS Victory 20 January 1945 to 1 February 1945
- HMS King Alfred 2 February 1945 to 29 March 1945
