= Nanette Wylde =

American artist and writer

Nanette Wylde is an American artist and writer. Wylde is known for her early incorporation of digital media as a fine art media, her work in net.art, electronic literature, and artwork which takes book form.

Wylde makes works which are interdisciplinary, conceptual, narrative, and often involve collaboration with other artists. She works in many media including artist books, digital and electronic media, installation, printmaking, and social practice.

== Early life and education ==
Wylde was born in California and grew up in San Jose.

Wylde's education includes an MFA from the Ohio State University where she studied interactive multimedia and printmaking (1996), a Bachelor's from San Jose State University in Behavioral Science (1986), and an Associate degree from West Valley College in Saratoga, California (1981).

Wylde claims her early influences to be artists Laurie Anderson, Jenny Holzer, Cindy Sherman, Ann Hamilton, Christine Tamblyn, and studying with Rupert Garcia at San Jose State University.

== Career ==
Wylde is a narrative artist with focus on storytelling with socio-cultural content. Many of her works are about stereotyping and involve cultural critique. Her themes include re-interpreting historical perspectives, and the reliability of information-based media. Later works have an environmental focus. She often includes audience participatory elements in her projects which allow participants to contribute to the works in meaningful and permanent ways. Wylde considers herself to be a conceptual artist and calls herself a cultural worker.

Her electronic works have been exhibited internationally.

Many reviewers comment on the humor in Wylde's work. In a discussion of a Jessica Gomula exhibition, Kim De Vries references Wylde, "This irreverence can be found in other artists working today such as Nanette Wylde . . . and reflects a contemporary skepticism about artistic theories and movements as such; a resistance to taking any of this system of artistic production and criticism too seriously.”

Collaboration with other artists is common in Wylde's practice with her primary collaboration partner being Kent Manske. Notable projects Manske and Wylde have worked together on include Foodies, Meaning Maker, Preserves, and You are the Tree commissioned for the Redwood City Art Kiosk by Lance Fung.

Her works are taught in university level literature and art classes.

=== Artist's books ===
Wylde works in the genre artist's books in which the artwork references or takes book form. She was commissioned by The San Francisco Center for the Book for their first year of small plates book projects in 2008. The book she created is Gray Matter Gardening: how to weed your mind.

Wylde makes books under the imprint Hunger Button Books. Her artist's books have exhibited widely, won awards, and are included in international book arts collections.

=== Digital media ===
Wylde began using digital media tools, Photoshop and Painter software, to create images in 1991. She often combined software with traditional printmaking such as lithography and relief printing. Her work is included in several early software (Photoshop and Painter) publications.

Wylde began working in interactive multimedia in 1994 while studying at Ohio State University's Advanced Computing Center for Art and Design. Her graduate thesis project was an interactive multimedia artwork titled A Brief History. The project was feminist in content, focusing on women's history and celebrating female diversity. The project included an interactive installation of images mounted on small wood blocks which the audience could move about on a series of small shelves to create their own narratives.

=== Electronic works and net.art ===
Wylde creates net.art projects and electronic projects which required a computer to be experienced, most frequently in an electronic flipbook format. Her electronic projects often allow audience input. Many use the computer's random function.

Carolyn Guertin writes about Wylde's electronic flipbooks, Arrested, Belief Manifesto and haikU, “Drawing from three different data streams, these texts recombine them to create instant works of art from a community experience. Arrested works along similar lines but more closely shows a genealogy with text-based experiments by feminist artists like Jenny Holzer and Barbara Kruger. Exploring our expectations of social posturing and the politics of rhetoric, Arrested toys with our expectations. Combining racial and ethnic groups with the politics of everyday activities, the texts consistently test our assumptions and challenges us to rethink them. While Arrested does not require the reader to input material, it does work to restate the reader in relation to the material she is reading. In short, It requires us to change our perspective and insert ourselves into the textual community to experience new points of view.”

Elizabeth Joe writes about Wylde's 2003 net.art project The Daily Planet Interactive: "In this project, she specifically parodies information delivery systems and (American) media culture. It is an interactive Net art project that aims to foster a new viewer outlook with respect to cultural identity and accepted social practices that are one-sided.” AND "Wylde addresses the ideas of society being consumed with the need to attain information by partially obscuring information from the viewer. Moreover, she continues to cleverly play with viewer expectations for she does not allow the headlines to run consistent with the newspaper format headings. In both respects, the viewers’ expectations are not met – they do not receive the information they want. These ideas closely mimic Wylde's underlying theme of how the media controls/manipulates information and only disseminates information they think should be important to the masses.” Joe continues, "It is also important to note Wylde’s tactic with respect to further addressing the idea that the media only distributes one-way communication to its viewers. Newspapers can be perceived as a social construction that propagates information for a specific purpose. Through her web project viewers are afforded 'two-way communication' where they are free to not only take in media headlines and personal entries, but are also afforded the opportunity to voice their questions and opinions.”

Wylde's electronic project Storyland is included in the first Electronic Literature Collection published by the Electronic Literature Organization.

=== Social Practice ===
Wylde works in the art genre of social practice. Her Meaning Maker project, which are free fill-out-form pamphlets on different subjects is one example. She works in the community by creating opportunities for other artists in the form of exhibitions and publications. Exhibitions Wylde has curated include Eco Echo at WORKS San Jose and Gallery Route One in Pt. Reyes Station, California; Pathways at Art Ark in San Jose, California; Biophilia at WORKS San Jose; Conceptually Bound at California State University in Chico and at The Mohr Gallery in Mountain View, California; The Legacy of Jo Hanson at Yolo Arts in Woodland, California. She creates publications featuring other artists' work in the form of exhibition catalogs and an annual anthology titled Entanglements.

Curator Gregory Flood says of the social practice project Preserves, "Kent Manske and Nanette Wylde created a large-scale participatory piece. What it looks like is a giant mason jar with the word “preserves” written across it. And they invite viewers to write on a little tag with a little string on it. And they write on it something that they would love to preserve as part of their culture or their food, and then they tie it on to that board. So it’s a really wonderful community engagement piece."

== Works ==
- A Brief History . . ., interactive multimedia installation, 1996
- Arrested, electronic flipbook, 1997
- about so many things, electronic flipbook, 1998
- Storyland, electronic literature, net.art, 2000
- haikU, digital poetry generator, electronic literature, net.art, 2001
- The Daily Planet Interactive, net.art, 2003
- ebaybies: genuine and lasting friends, conceptual series of intaglio prints, 2003–2004
- Jargon Reducer, net.art, 2005
- Meaning Maker, social practice project, democratic multiple, net.art, installation, 2006
- Gray Matter Gardening: How to weed your mind, artist's book, San Francisco Center for the Book, 2008
- On Judgment: the book of bully, artist's book, 2012
- Preserves, with Kent Manske, sculpture and installation, 2015
- Foodies: Seven West Coast Foodie Vignettes, with Kent Manske, artists' book, 2017
- You Are The Tree, with Kent Manske, sculpture and installation, 2020
- Encyclopedic: Weathered Volumes, conceptual book works, 2023
- Leaving Digital, electronic literature, net.art, 2023

== Collections ==
- Achenbach Foundation for Graphic Arts, Fine Arts Museums of San Francisco, San Francisco, California
- Almutanabbi Street Starts Here archive, Rare Book and Manuscript Library, Butler Library, Columbia University, New York, New York
- Bainbridge Island Museum of Art, Bainbridge Island, Washington
- Baylor University Libraries, Waco, Texas
- Boise State University Albertson's Library
- Decker Library, Maryland Institute College of Art
- Duke University Library, Durham, NC
- George Mason University, Fenwick Library, Fairfax, VA
- Harvard University Fine Arts Library, Cambridge, MA
- MIT Libraries, Cambridge, MA
- Oakland Museum of California
- Olin Library, Cornell University, Ithica, New York
- San Francisco Public Library, San Francisco, CA
- Santa Clara University, Santa Clara, CA
- Savannah College of Art and Design, Jen Library, Savannah, GA
- Staatsbibliothek zu Berlin – Preußischer Kulturbesitz, Haus Potsdamer Straße, Berlin, Germany
- Stanford University Libraries, Stanford, California
- The Center for the Study of the Book, The Bodleian Libraries, University of Oxford, Oxford, United Kingdom
- Tufts University Tisch Library, Medford, MA
- University of California, Berkeley: Artists' Books Collection
- UC Davis Shields Library, Davis, CA
- UC Santa Cruz, Santa Cruz, CA
- University of Colorado Boulder, Boulder, CO
- University of Iowa Library, Iowa City, Iowa
- University of Michigan, Ann Arbor, MI
- University of Pennsylvania Libraries, Philadelphia, PA
- University of Washington Libraries, Seattle, Washington
