= Berkeley-Rupp Architecture Professorship and Prize =

The Berkeley-Rupp Architecture Professorship and Prize is a prize awarded every two years by the University of California, Berkeley College of Environmental Design (UEC). The cash portion of the prize includes $100,000 awarded to the recipient. Recipients also earn a semester-long professorship at UC Berkeley. The prize is intended to honor a "distinguished design practitioner or academic who has made significant contributions to advance gender equity in the field of architecture, and whose work exhibits commitment to sustainability and community."

== History ==
Sigrid Lorenzen Rupp created the idea of the prize prior to her death in 2004, in order to "foster a holistic approach to architecture and professional practice." Jennifer Wolch, Dean of UEC, helped lead the effort to establishing the prize. The inaugural year for the prize was 2012.

The physical representation of the prize, created by Associate Professor Ronald Rael (Berkeley) and Associate Professor Virginia San Fratello (San Jose State University), is made of 3D printed ceramic. Rather than the two dimensional medals awarded as architecture prizes, whose history is rooted in war, the three-dimensional award and is "fabricated under the new paradigm of additive manufacturing" using humankind oldest and most humble material.

== Winners ==
Prize Winners
Name	Image	Birth–Death	Year	Area of achievement
Deborah Berke			2012	First recipient of the prize.
Sheila Kennedy			2014	Creator of innovative, soft material structures that are applicable in diverse situations.
Carme Pinós			2016	Founder of the Estudio Carme Pinós .
Deanna Van Buren			2018	Founder of Designing Justice + Designing Spaces (DJDS).
