= Franklin Furnace Archive =

Franklin Furnace Archive, Inc
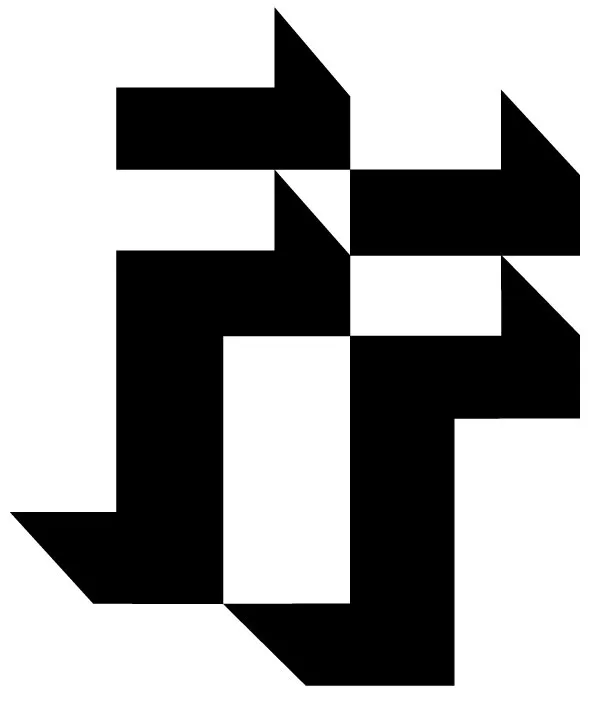
- Formation: April 3, 1976
- Founder: Martha Wilson
- Type: Arts Organization
- Headquarters: 30-30 47th Avenue, Suite 470 Long Island City, NY 11101
- Founding Director Emerita: Martha Wilson
- Ken Dewey Director (Executive Director): Harley Spiller
- Website: www.franklinfurnace.org

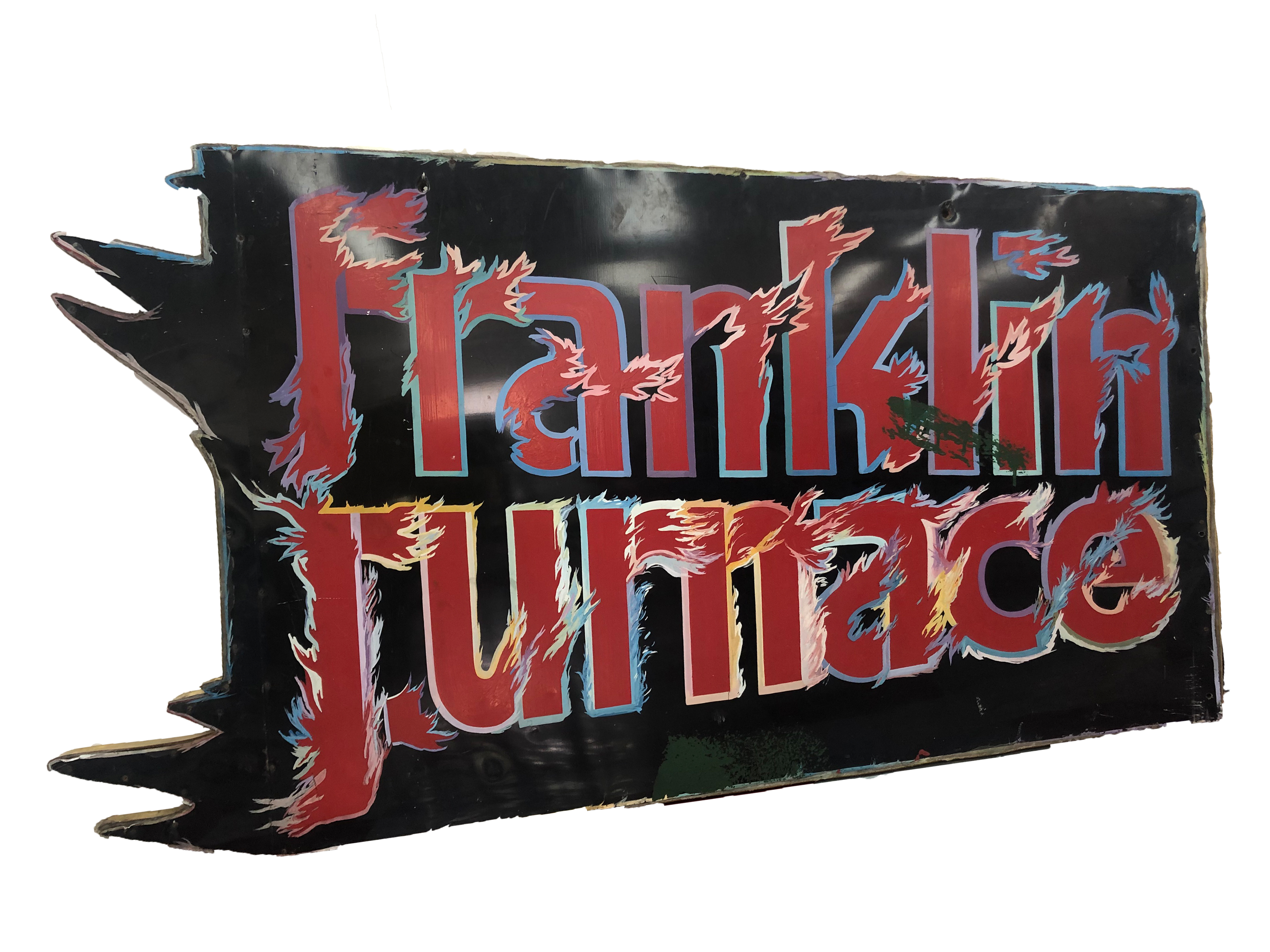
Ilona Granet, Franklin Furnace original two-sided outdoor sign, 1980, paint on metal-covered plywood, c. 58 × 37 ×1 inch

Franklin Furnace Archive, Inc. is an arts organization, now located in Long Island City, New York City. Since its inception on Manhattan's Franklin Street in 1976, Franklin Furnace has been presenting and archiving avant-garde art and making it available to the public. Franklin Furnace is dedicated to serving emerging artists by providing both physical and virtual venues for the presentation of time-based art, including but not limited to artists' books and periodicals, site-specific installations, performance art, and live art on the internet. It focuses on time-based art forms that may be vulnerable due to institutional neglect, cultural bias, politically unpopular content or their ephemeral or experimental nature.

In 1990, Franklin Furnace's basement performance space was closed by the New York City Fire Department in response to an anonymous caller. Since that time, Franklin Furnace has been presenting performance art to new audiences throughout New York City by developing strategic partnerships with institutions large and small, from The Brooklyn Museum and The New School for Social Research to Dixon Place, The Knitting Factory, and public spaces across the five boroughs. Franklin Furnace moved to its new Long Island City location in 2025.

== History ==
Franklin Furnace was founded in 1976 by Martha Wilson to serve artists who chose publishing as a primary, "democratic" conceptual artistic medium and were not being supported by existing arts organizations. From its inception, Franklin Furnace's energies focused on three aspects of "time-based" art: its collection of artists' books; its performance art program for emerging artists; and its exhibitions of time-based arts, both site-specific installations by contemporary artists, and historical and contemporary exhibitions of artists' books and other ephemeral arts.

In 1985, Franklin Furnace established the Franklin Furnace FUND for Performance Art, an annual grant program for early career artists chosen by peer panel review. The same year, the Franklin Furnace inaugurated Sequential Art for Kids, an arts-in-education program that places professional artists in New York City public school classrooms. Since its establishment, SEQART has grown into an award-winning arts education program that is fully integrated with public school curriculum, having by 2021 sent a total of 41 artists into 58 NYC public elementary schools to serve over 8,550 children. Starting in 2016, SEQART has also been providing arts education services for adults in senior citizen and wellness centers.

In 1993, Franklin Furnace and the Museum of Modern Art signed an agreement to merge Franklin Furnace's collection of artists' books published internationally after 1960—the largest repository of this nature in the United States—with that of MOMA, forming a permanent resource of unparalleled value.

During its 20th anniversary season in 1996 and 1997, Franklin Furnace sold its original loft and reinvented itself as a "virtual institution," not identified with its real estate but rather with its resources, made accessible by electronic and other means. No longer providing a venue for performance art projects, the organization continues to provide grants and other support to performance artists via the Franklin Furnace FUND for Performance Art. From 1998 to 2004, Franklin Furnace's headquarters were at 45 John Street in lower Manhattan.

Between 1998 and 1999, in the early days of the internet, Franklin Furnace presented new time-based art by 32+ artists to worldwide audiences through The Future of the Present, its pioneering online collaboration with Pseudo Programs, Inc. In 2023, British artist/curator Elly Clarke, who was an intern at Franklin Furnace from 1998-9, curated an exhibition in the library at Pratt Institute entitled 'Dragging the archive - a personal re:encounter with Franklin Furnace's cyber beginnings' that explored the shift Franklin Furnace took at that time from being a physical organization to a 'virtual' one.

In 2008, The Franklin Furnace FUND for Performance Art and the Future of the Present grant programs were combined to institute the Franklin Furnace FUND. With the continued support of Jerome Foundation, the NYC Department of Cultural Affairs and others, as of 2021, Franklin Furnace has awarded grants ranging between $2,000 and $10,000 to a total of 382 artists.

On October 1, 2004, Franklin Furnace moved from the Financial District to 80 Arts - The James E. Davis Arts Building in the BAM cultural district at 80 Hanson Place in Brooklyn where it remained until Fall, 2014 when Franklin Furnace relocated to Pratt Institute's Brooklyn campus under an organization-in-residence agreement. The decision to "nest" within Pratt Institute coincided with the announcement of Pratt's new Master of Fine Arts program in Performance + Performance Studies.

In mid-2020 in response to the global pandemic, Franklin Furnace pivoted to continue offering services for avant-garde artists and their aficionados by launching the LOFT, an online digital presenting platform. By March 2022, the LOFT had presented the work of 300+ Franklin Furnace artist alumns in 24 free public programs.

During its 50-year history, Franklin Furnace has gained a national and international reputation for identifying artists who have changed the terms by which contemporary avant-garde art is discussed; mounted scholarly exhibitions that have embodied the history of 20th-century avant-garde activity; and stood up for the right of artists to freedom of expression as guaranteed under the First Amendment to the United States Constitution.

== Notable artist alumns ==
Among hundreds of artists who Franklin Furnace gave the opportunity to mount their first New York shows are Ida Applebroog, Guillaume Bijl, Dara Birnbaum, Willie Cole, Jenny Holzer, Tehching Hsieh, Barbara Kruger, Matt Mullican, Shirin Neshat, and Krzysztof Wodiczko. Among the many performance artists who got their start at Franklin Furnace are Eric Bogosian, David Cale, Guillermo Gómez-Peña, Karen Finley, Robbie McCauley, Theodora Skipitares, Michael Smith, and Paul Zaloom. Additionally, Franklin Furnace's programs have enabled more established artists like Vito Acconci, Laurie Anderson, Jennifer Bartlett, Lee Breuer, Richard Foreman, Joan Jonas, Pope.L, and William Wegman to experiment in ways that would be inappropriate for mainstream venues. Franklin Furnace's exhibition program has presented many historically notable exhibitions of time-based art of an ephemeral nature, including critically celebrated exhibitions on Cubist books and prints, Fluxus, and Hungarian and Russian Samizdat art, contributing to international art history scholarship.

== Current projects ==
=== The Franklin Furnace FUND ===
Granted annually, the Franklin Furnace FUND aims to help artists produce major performance art works in New York City. Rather than having a curator, the FUND relies on a peer review panel to select grant recipients. Each year, a new panel of artists reviews all applications and determines the allocation of funding. Eligible artists are early-career, non-student, vocational artists who create innovative, imaginative, and authentic performance art. Although artists from everywhere in the world can apply, grant recipients are expected to showcase their FUND projects in New York City.

=== Artists' Book Collection ===
Franklin Furnace's Artists' Books Collection has been a core program since the organization's 1976 inception as an artists' book store. By 1977, Printed Matter bookstore had opened a few blocks away, leaving Franklin Furnace to continue its work as an artists' book archives and exhibition center.

When the Museum of Modern Art (MoMA) acquired the Franklin Furnace collection of artists' books in 1993, the collection consisted of over 13,500 artists' books, magazines, and audiotapes, forming the largest collection of artists' books in the United States: the Museum of Modern Art/Franklin Furnace/Artist Book Collection. To this day, Franklin Furnace continues to maintain and build its own artists' books collection at the Pratt Institute campus in Brooklyn, and to give duplicate donations to the Museum of Modern Art/Franklin Furnace/Artist Book Collection.

==== Event Archives and Moving Image Archives ====
Franklin Furnace's virtual Event Archives is a searchable database with information about performance art works, temporary installations, exhibitions, and special events hosted by Franklin Furnace. Franklin Furnace's Moving Image Archives is a burgeoning research collection consisting in 2021 of 140 videos originally recorded as VHS tapes which document art events, particularly performance art, presented or supported by Franklin Furnace during the 1980s, 1990s, and early 2000s. Franklin Furnace's archives have received important support from the Council on Library and Information Resources, The Gladys Krieble Delmas Foundation, Pine Tree Foundation of New York, and the National Endowment for the Arts.

Documentation of Franklin Furnace's artists and artworks are also available on the Artstor website. The public is invited to make appointments to conduct research in Franklin Furnace's physical archives at its Brooklyn offices.

==== The Sketchbooks of Ree Morton archives ====
The Sketchbooks of Ree Morton, an American visual artist from the postminimalist period, are also available as an online research resource offered by Franklin Furnace. Importantly, this collection provides the only evidence of many of her ephemeral, yet important pieces. The estate of Ree Morton donated 22 sketchbooks, 16 notebooks, and more to Franklin Furnace in 1988, all of which is accessible online.

==== The Flue archives ====
Conceived and instituted in 1980 by artist and printer Conrad Gleber, The Flue was a periodical totalling sixteen issues published by Franklin Furnace between 1980 and 1989. The idea for an artist-driven publication was inspired by the tabloid-format catalog of Chicago Books' 1980 Franklin Furnace installation, "Chicago". The in-house periodical spanned a range of formats, including tabloids and posters, organizational newsletters, exhibition supplements and catalogs, and scholarly surveys of contemporary and historical artists book movements. The range in media formats reflect the multitude of editors and designers who worked on the periodical, including Barbara Kruger, Richard McGuire, Linda Montano, and Buzz Spector. In a collaboration with Primary Information, the entire run of The Flue has been digitized and made available online.

== Exhibitions ==
=== In the Shadow of Duchamp: The Photomechanical Revolution ===
In June 1976, Franklin Furnace held the exhibition In the Shadow of Duchamp: The Photomechanical Revolution at The Grolier Club in New York City. The works showcased were selected by Weston J. Naef and Martha Wilson.

=== Action Theater: The Happenings of Ken Dewey ===
In 1987, Barbara Moore curated the retrospective exhibition Action Theater: The Happenings of Ken Dewey, including rarely-seen performance videos, diagrams, instructions, and photographs of Ken Dewey and peers. Moore also edited the accompanying catalog, which features a color Xerox cover by Carolee Schneemann, artists' pages by Alison Knowles, Robert Wilson, and others, and a portfolio of Peter Moore's photographs of performances and installations by Suki Dewey, Geoff Hendricks, Guerrilla Art Action Group, Les Levine, Charlotte Moorman, John Lennon and Yoko Ono, Nam June Paik, and others, all friends and colleagues of Ken Dewey. In 2019, the Ken Dewey directorship of Franklin Furnace was established in honor of artist and arts administrator Ken Dewey.

=== The Page as Alternative Space 1909-1929 ===
Curators of this 1976 exhibition The Page as Alternative Space 1909-1929 included Clive Phillpot, 1909–1929; Charles Henri Ford, 1930–1949; Jon Hendricks and Barbara Moore, 1950–1969; Ingrid Sischy and Richard Flood, 1970–1980. This exhibition inaugurated Franklin Furnace's commitment to presenting the historical antecedents of the contemporary artists' book publishing movement.

=== Cubist Prints/Cubist Books ===
Curated by Donna Stein, the exhibition Cubist Prints/Cubist Books began its national tour at Franklin Furnace in 1983, and made additional stops at the California Palace of the Legion of Honor, San Francisco; The Fine Arts Museums of San Francisco; the Center for the Fine Arts, Miami; The Marian Koogler McNay Art Museum, San Antonio; and Galerie Berggruen, Paris, France.

=== The Avant-Garde Book: 1900-1945 ===
Held February 24 through May 6, 1989, The Avant-Garde Book: 1910-1945 exhibition showcased artists' books selected by Jaroslav Andel, a freelance curator and art historian. The exhibition began with a first edition of Alfred Jarry's "Ubu Roi" (1896) and ranged through Russian Constructivism, Futurism, Dada, and Surrealism. It featured original editions of artists' books by Guillaume Appollinaire, André Breton, Salvador Dalí, Marcel Duchamp, Max Ernst, Francis Picabia, Tristan Tzara and others.

=== In the Flow: Alternate Authoring Strategies ===
The 1996 exhibition In the Flow: Alternate Authoring Strategies, curated by Daniel O. Goerges showcased the evolution of the nature of artistic authorship across the age of information and focused on art as a flow of information rather than as finished, physical product.

=== The C-Series: Artists' Books and Collection Action ===
The C-Series: Artists' Books and Collective Action was curated by Courtney J. Martin and presented from November 2004 through January 2005 at the Nathan Cummings Foundation, New York. Works presented were selected from the third set ("C" copies) of artists' books returned to Franklin Furnace after the Museum of Modern Art acquired the Franklin Furnace collection of artists' books in 1993.

=== The History of Disappearance ===
The History of Disappearance, curated by Nicole Hood and Martha Wilson, was held at the BALTIC Center for Contemporary Art in Gateshead, UK, from June 18 through September 4, 2005. The exhibition featured video and photographic documentation of 1,300 publications or performance artworks from the Franklin Furnace archive. Artists whose works were featured include Patty Chang, Andrea Fraser, Coco Fusco, Tehching Hsieh, Susan Mogul, Linda Montano, Pope.L., Matt Mullican and William Wegman.

=== Historias ===
The bilingual Spanish-English exhibition Historias features multi-media works from the late 1970s through 2020, by Argentine artists, most of whom are Franklin Furnace alumns. The exhibition focuses on the military dictatorship that took over the Argentine government in 1976, the human rights violations that occurred under its rule, and the subsequent return to a democratic government. The exhibition includes works by Bedevo et al., C.A.PA.TA.CO/GAS-TAR (Fernando Amengual, Mercedes Idoyaga "Emei", Fernando "Coco" Bedoya, Diego Fontanet, Joan Prim, Carlos N. Tirabassi, and Daniel Sanjurjo), Jaime Davidovich, León Ferrari, Por El Ojo (Julia Balmaceda, Federico Gonzalez, Daniel Sanjurjo, and Ignacio Sourrouille), Liliana Porter, and Dolores Zorreguieta. Presented online in 2020 as Franklin Furnace's first virtual exhibition, Historias include essays by Ruth Benitez, Agustina Bullrich, and Fernando Noy, with translations by Rossy Ramos and Agustina Bullrich, and interviews by Ruth Benitez with Federico Gonzalez, Liliana Porter, Ignacio Sourrouille, and Dolores Zorreguieta.

== Key staff, 2025 ==
- Harley Spiller, Ken Dewey Director
- Fang-Yu Liu, Senior Archivist
- Xinan Ran, Program Director
- Mary Suk, Financial Manager
- Martha Wilson, Founding Director Emerita
- In memoriam: Michael Katchen, Senior Archivist

== Controversy ==
=== Culture wars ===
Franklin Furnace was on the frontlines of the culture wars of the 1980s and 1990s, a period when censorship and discrimination cast shadows across the U.S. art scene. Notably, in January 1984, Franklin Furnace presented the artists' collective Carnival Knowledge's Second Coming, a performance series that questioned the possibility of a more "feminist porn". Performances included mud-wrestling artists and monologues by sex workers. In response, the Morality Action Committee picketed outside of the performances and coordinated a postcard campaign where church groups complained to Franklin Furnace's funders. In addition, the United States' National Endowment for the Arts requested that the agency not be credited where it was not fully responsible for the programming.

=== NEA four ===
In May 1990, Franklin Furnace's basement performance space was closed by the NYC Fire Department in response to an anonymous call. Following the closure, Franklin Furnace was demonized by Republican Senator Jesse Helms for presenting Karen Finley's A Woman's Life Isn't Worth Much (1990), which led to a U.S. General Accounting Office review and audits by the Internal Revenue Service. Franklin Furnace had previously supported performance artists Karen Finley, John Fleck, and Holly Hughes. On June 21, 1992, at the invitation of Director Robert T. Buck, with introductory remarks by Carole S. Vance, The Brooklyn Museum hosted Franklin Furnace's afternoon performance event, "Too Shocking To Show," with live performances by Tim Miller (an excerpt from My Queer Body), Holly Hughes (an excerpt from Snatches), Scarlet O (an excerpt from Appearances Can Be Deceiving), and Sapphire, who read her poem Wild Thing. An excerpt from a letter written by Martha Wilson explains:

"The year was 1989 when Karen Finley, Holly Hughes, John Fleck and Tim Miller's Fellowship applications were brought up before the National Council, the body of Presidential appointees which oversees the grants made by the National Endowment for the Arts. Segments of tapes of performances were shown. Someone said it was 'politically impossible' to award grants to these artists, all of whom take sexuality as one of their subjects. The artists, with the assistance of the National Campaign for Freedom of Expression, joined by the National Association of Artists' Organizations and numerous other groups such as The New School and the Rockefeller Foundation, argued successfully that their grants could not be rescinded just because they were politically unpopular. The grants were eventually restored."

In 1993 the NEA settled with the four artists out of court and gave them the grants they had been denied. Still, they decided to litigate against the NEA's congressionally approved "decency clause," but on June 25, 1998, The Supreme Court upheld the decency clause while declaring the language "advisory" and meaningless.

=== NEA grant rescinded ===
In January, 1992, the Visual Artists Organizations grant Franklin Furnace had been awarded by the National Endowment for the Arts was rescinded by the National Council because of the sexually explicit content of a 1991 performance by Scarlet O. The Peter Norton Family Foundation stepped in to replace this $25,000 grant.
