= Paul Kos =

American conceptual artist and educator (born 1942)

- Born: December 23, 1942 (age 83); Rock Springs, Wyoming, U.S.
- Education: San Francisco Art Institute
- Known for: Conceptual art, video art, sculpture
- Spouses: Isabelle Sorrell; Marlene Kos (div. 1992)
- Website: http://www.paulkos.net/Paul_Kos/home.html

Paul Joseph Kos (born December 23, 1942) is an American conceptual artist and educator, he is one of the founders of the Bay Area Conceptual Art movement in California. Kos incorporates video, sound and interactivity into his sculptural installations. Currently Kos lives and works in San Francisco.

== Biography ==
Paul Kos was born December 23, 1942, in Rock Springs, Wyoming, to parents Bertha Kos and small-town doctor Paul A. Kos. He moved from Wyoming to San Francisco in the early 1960s. He received both his B.F.A degree in 1965 and M.F.A degree in 1967 from the San Francisco Art Institute.

In 1969, Tom Marioni organized and curated Paul Kos' first solo exhibition, Participationkinetics, at the Richmond Art Center.

Kos taught at San Francisco Art Institute for 30 years, starting in 1978 and he was influential in the development of the New Genres Department (previously named the Performance/Video Department).

Besides his studio practice, Kos has made large scale public art installations including: Poetry Sculpture Garden with Poet Laureate, Bob Hass, at 199 Fremont Street, San Francisco and “Every thing matters” for the J. Michael Bishop Collection at the UCSF Mission Bay Campus.

The first major retrospective of his work “Everything Matters” (2003) was held at the Berkeley Art Museum and Pacific Film Archive. A second major survey of the artist's work, "Equilibrium: A Paul Kos Survey" (2016) was held at di Rosa Center for Contemporary Art in Napa.

=== Collections ===
His work is included in many public museum collections including Museum of Contemporary Art San Diego, Solomon R. Guggenheim Museum, Museum of Modern Art (MoMA), San Francisco Museum of Modern Art, De Saisset Museum at Santa Clara University, Nora Eccles Harrison Museum of Art at Utah State University, Stedelijk Museum, Modern Art Museum of Fort Worth, Institute of Contemporary Art, Philadelphia, Everson Museum of Art, Long Beach Museum of Art, Wallraf-Richartz Museum, Auckland Art Gallery, di Rosa Center for Contemporary Art, amongst others.

=== Awards ===
Kos is the recipient of numerous awards, including Louis Comfort Tiffany Foundation Fellowship (1985); John Simon Guggenheim Memorial Foundation fellowship in video and audio (1990); multiple National Endowment for the Arts (NEA) fellowships; and Flintridge Foundation Fellowship award (1999). Kos held the Dodd Chair at the University of Georgia.

== Work ==
The Sound of the Ice Melting, 1970

In the mid-1960s he worked on abstract fiberglass sculptures, but he then turned away from those to more site-specific art. During the 1970s Kos collaborated with his former wife Marlene Kos, together they produced numerous videos and installations. His work has a strong connection to the natural world and often has a religious dimension. He does not limit himself to one type of media, because his work is conceptual he will often pick the medium to best suit the concept. He will often hire people to help with the technical aspects of the work, if need be. He agrees to technological updates to his work (such as older video work) if they are needed, as long as the sensibility and feeling remains the same.

=== The Sound of the Ice Melting (1970) ===
A conceptual art piece, first produced in 1970. The work includes 10 boom microphones plugged into an active sound system recorded the sound of 25 pound blocks of ice melting in a metal pan on the floor. The photographic image of the installation has an absurdity about it. It asks the question, "what does ice sound like as it melts?"

=== Chartres Bleu (1982–1986) ===
This piece is a video work, represents a full-scale recreation of a stained-glass stained glass windows in Chartres Cathedral. Twenty seven monitors, vertically stacked show the glass panels of the famous church over a period of twenty four hours, condensed into twelve minutes. Readability of represented narrative scenes changes, depending on the changes of the light. The work is permanently on view at di Rosa Center for Contemporary Art in Napa.

=== Sand Piece (1971) ===
A two-story gallery was transformed into an hourglass shape of sand. A ton of sand that was placed on the upper floor was sifting through a minute hole to the lower level, in the shape of a perfect cone.

=== rEvolution: Notes for the Invasion: mar mar march (1972–1973) ===
Video installation work, the viewer must walk around narrow planks of wood to see a monitor that shows a small figure marching above typewriter keys that spell out, "mar mar march". Interesting correlation between the fiction and the reality and mechanical regularity of little man's steps and disposition of wooden planks. This video work has a satire element, mocking militant nationalism with the marching sounds.

=== Tower of Babel (1989) ===
Tower of Babel was created in 1989 and is an 20‐channel video installation, with a large, spiral‐ shaped metal armature (Vladimir Tatlin–inspired) the supported the monitors. On the monitors are 75 different people speaking in 50 different languages. Cacophony seems indecipherable, unless a viewer comes closer to individual monitors. The work criticizes divisions between different cultures and advocates international understanding. This piece is inspired by a Biblical story of the Tower of Babel in which people used to speak only one language before they became too ambitious and tried to build a tower to the heavens, God made them speak different languages so that they could not understand each other.

=== Pawn (1991) ===
The work Pawn was completed in 1991, and featured 2,500 plastic magnetic chess pieces, steel panel on the wall, and wood. The steel panel is on the wall, with the magnetic red chess (kings, queens, knights, bishops and castles) pieces forming the shape of a single chess pawn. These pieces don't mimic pawn's symmetry but the illusion of light and shadow in bright red. This work is a metaphor for the relations between the world's powerful and the powerless. The red pawn also presents a metaphor for life under Communism.

=== Donner Pass, 2021 ===
Commissioned for the Redwood City Art Kiosk in 2021 by curator Lance Fung, Donner Pass is a "sublime nature at Donner Pass: sunrise over Donner Lake (from the exact site of the famous Bierstadt painting), water coursing down the red rock of the Yuba River, a Sierra snowstorm at night and a crackling fire on the hearth."

== Filmography ==
Select filmography
Year	Title	Type, materials	Artist(s)	Notes
1970	Hand Trap	Black and white, Silent, Super 8	Paul Kos	
1972	rEVOLUTION: Notes for the Invasion: mar mar march	Black and white, 1/2" open reel video	Paul Kos	
1976	Lightning	Black and white, 1/2" open reel video	Paul Kos, Marlene Kos	The lightning bolt strikes every time Marlene looks away.
2003	Spark, Trailblazers: Paul Kos	Television	Paul Kos	He was featured on the television show Spark (episode 10, season 1), episode Trailblazers: Paul Kos.
2017	The Electric Mirror: Reflecting on Video Art in the 1970s	Television	Compilation featuring Lynda Benglis, Keith Sonnier, Susan Mogul, William Wegman, Nancy Holt, John Baldessari, Simone Forti, Marlene Kos, Paul Kos, Barbara Aronofsky Latham	A video catalogue of early experimentation with and in the closed circuit system.

== Bibliography ==
=== Books ===
- Lewallen, Constance (2003). Everything Matters: Paul Kos, A Retrospective (Art exhibition). University of California, Berkeley Art Museum and Pacific Film Archive (Author), Pacific Film Archive (Author). University of California, Berkeley Art Museum and Pacific Film Archive. ISBN 978-0971939721.
- Phillips, Glenn (2008). California Video: Artists and Histories (Art exhibition). J. Paul Getty museum (author). Getty Publications. ISBN 9780892369225.

== See also ==
- Conceptual Art
- Earth art or Land art
- Arte Povera
- Installation art
- Video Art
- Video installation
- Video sculpture
