= Jennifer Wen Ma =

- Born: 1973 (age 52–53)
- Education: Oklahoma Christian University (BA), Pratt Institute (MFA)
- Website: www.littlemeat.net

Jennifer Wen Ma (Chinese: 马文 1973, Beijing, China) is a visual artist working and living in New York and Beijing. Ma's interdisciplinary practice bridges varied media such as installation, drawing, video, public art, design, performance, and theatre.

== Early life ==
Ma was born in Beijing China, in 1973. After moving from Beijing to Oklahoma, Ma started drawing and painting as an alternative to literature, from which she felt alienated having to speak a second language. Ma received a Bachelor of Arts degree in advertising design from Oklahoma Christian University of Science and Arts. In 1999, she earned a Master of Fine Arts degree at Pratt Institute in New York.

== Career ==
Post graduation, she worked for eight years as the studio director for artist Cai Guo-Qiang.

=== Early works ===
Ma's initial practical training in advertising fostered in her "a production and design aesthetic … in the sense that she is responsive to the qualities and needs of materials as well as to the demands of place and public," while remaining critical of market and client. In 2001, Ma fought with another female Asian artist/designer in the live-wrestling performance Crouching Bitch at Deitch Projects. The combat signified the competition between Ma's own short-lived Dodorama fashion label and her co-combatant's, mocking the concurrent New York Fashion Week where downtown designers rivaled to be the "best."

The iconoclastic dimension of Crouching Bitch continued in installations such as Wash Hands, made in Beijing in 2003, and Project Change World: City of Yan'an in 2006, but within a more social and political context. In Wash Hands, formally conforming to the government-led hygiene campaign against SARS, Ma instigated unease by asking viewers to wash hands in the same bowl of water. Seemingly in honor of the once politically significant city Yan'an, Project Change World: City of Yan'an was a public service program to highlight, poke fun, and instigate into the universally mocked Chinglish.

Ma continued to deal with social consciousness and psychology. In Self-Comfort, a 2005 installation, a video of a woman masturbating was projected onto an actual bed, presenting a self-guided release from loneliness and tension in daily life. The conventionally ignoble act obtained an ambiguous meaning by reflecting the universal loneliness in society.

Subsequent works stay highly aware of people's ways of living, with more focus on the spiritual life. The video installation Alms was part of the Singapore Biennale in 2006. The video trilogy was set in three religious sites of distinct beliefs. It featured a hand clasping, revealing and finally losing glass balls. The sound track was composed out of recordings of vocal and instrumental sounds of worship at each site. The project underscored the Biennial's theme of "Belief" by drawing connections between sites of three distinctive religions, namely Judaism, Islam and Christianity. More fundamentally, the glass balls symbolized the balance that is being constantly negotiated in spiritual life.

Alms is the continuation of Ma's reflection upon religious life since Aeolian Garden at UMOCA in 2005, a work consisting of brass windpipes installed under the medieval bridge of San Francesco in the Tuscan town of Colle di Val d'Elsa, creating an atmospheric soundscape. The bridge, initially built to lead people from daily life to religious refuge, "can once again serve as a conduit for contemplation and reflection." The work remains part of the town's cultural patrimony.

While Alms and Aeolian Garden do call for the coexistence of religions and the peace of mind, the idea of dissonance is another running theme of Ma's early works. The dissonance within social life is subtly allegorized by the use of sound. For the short video Rear Window, Ma documented the nightlife of people living in a large residential complex across the street from her apartment. The video is accompanied by sound tracks composed from the artist's own imagination, which makes the much-desired intimacy a mere projection of one's own psyche. Communication seems unachievable despite the voyeuristic observation. The dissonance continues in the soundscapes created by Aeolian Garden. Mario Cristinati observes that, "The music … may be harmonious or dissonant, depending on the particular wind conditions … It also demonstrates how nature intervenes with our senses … similar to how spiritual life and daily life collide." The soundtrack for Alms combined from sound recorded at three religious sites, is also at times cacophonous, revealing a critical attitude toward tolerance and unity.

=== The Beijing Olympics and Large-Scale Projects ===
Ma was one of the seven core creative team members, and Chief Designer for Visual and Special Effects for the Opening Ceremony of the 2008 Summer Olympic in Beijing, working with colleagues such as the renowned film director Zhang Yimou, choreographers Zhang Jigang and Chen Weiya, contemporary artist Cai Guo-Qiang, and theatre directors Fan Yue and Wang Chaoge. Ma was the youngest member of the creative team, and was thought to exemplify the younger generation of China "that's trying to reinvent how China thinks and works" by inserting creativity to the country's art and industry. She received an Emmy for the US broadcast of the ceremony.

Ma returned to work with Olympic venues in 2009, transforming the façade of Digital Beijing into a LED work entitled In-Between World—Daydream Nation. In 2013, Ma embarked on the light design for the Water Cube. The project Nature and Man in Rhapsody of Light at the Water Cube incorporates traditional Eastern philosophy and modern technology. The building's celluloid body shined in different colors, rhythms, movements, and compositions in patterns calculated daily by a computer logarithm based on daily I Ching readings, and societal conditions as reflected in social media statistics.

Ma's competence to implement large installations and projects stands out among her contemporaries. While collaborative projects like the Olympics showcased her competence for coordination, Ma's work as an individual artist also shone. The New Adventures of Havoc in Heaven commenced a few days before the Olympic opening ceremony. Taking place over Tiananmen Square, conjuring the figure of the beloved mythological figure Monkey King wielding his magic staff, this work was a direct reaction against the inequalities Ma witnessed while working for the Olympics. In this way, she borrowed the Monkey King's insubordinate spirit in the manner of a self-manifesto.

On the occasion of the 17th Biennale of Sydney in 2012, Ma created another smoke-cloud installation depicting the Monkey King. The New Adventures of Havoc in Heaven III was beamed onto manufactured clouds over the Sydney Opera House. This mediation on the Monkey King was a continuation of her "vibrant, defiant" work The New Adventures of Havoc in Heaven II in London for the Mythologies exhibition.

In 2015, Ma drew upon traditional Chinese philosophy to design a grand performance for the Spartan Marching Band of the Michigan State University. The massive campus arena was "the perfect venue for bridging cultural understandings." The marriage of Sun Tzu's "The Art of War" and marching band techniques was received positive feedback from both performers and audiences.

=== Ink-Based Works ===
Charta published Ma's self-titled bilingual monograph in 2013. According to the introduction by Thomas Krens, Director Emeritus of Solomon R. Guggenheim Foundation, her "fluency is simultaneously linguistic, experimental and historical." The mediation between Eastern and Western cultures has already manifested itself in Ma's early works and becomes more prominent with her growing interest in traditional Chinese medium and iconography.

The use of Chinese ink in Ma's works assumes complex meanings in a contemporary discourse. Her video Brain Storm juxtaposes her manipulation of fluid ink painting with an unwaveringly walking man and horse, evoking "a life's journey or a psychic one" whose "unfolding we witness with curiosity and fascination." She was seen to have rendered "a new artistic language of time-based landscape painting." From 15 October 2009–3 January 2010, The Phillips Collection displayed Brain Storm, reconfigured “…for the smaller, more intimate space of the Phillips, adding an audio component—the sound of breath blown through lips—that reinforces the atmospheric quality of the piece.”

Ink was also used to address issues such as time and life. Ma's solo exhibition Inked with the Eslite Gallery in 2011 applied ink to live plants from which green leaves kept bursting out, displaying the resilience of life.

The strength of life has been explored multiple times with variance. Ma offered a more complex interpretation of such a practice on the occasion of her 2014 work Black Beauty—A Living Totem. During an interview, she indicated that chance element was taken more into consideration. The "uneven process of regeneration and degeneration" of plants under "the duress of pollutants and the disruption" "[offered] a commentary on the way we live today [revealing] the individual decisions that are made under the stress of everyday life."

In Alpha Lillstrom Portrait Garden, commissioned in 2014 for Nonument Park as a part of Washington, D.C.'s 5x5 public art festival, this artistic practice gained a more public dimension. Art's relationship with the public was explored further in A Winter Landscape Cradling Bits of Sparkle, created in 2015 as part of the Market Square Public Art Program in Pittsburg. Inked plants installed in winter evolved with green leaves and bright flowers as spring approached, transforming the otherwise blackened forest, encouraging citizens to feel and embrace seasons.

Ink "can also be a means to examine the recurrent presence of memories," as viewers walked between inked mounds of sand in her work Non, Je Ne Regrette Rien, 2011, exploring a personal landscape dotted with artifacts from the artist's life. Inked Friendship, carrying on the discussion about time, memory and life, was created in memory of a deceased friend.

=== Public Art ===
Ma's wildly eclectic oeuvre can be connected by the general theme of interactivity as embodied by public participation in her work. Awareness of the public was already present in her earlier works, which grappled with concrete social issues ranging from English signs in China to religion. Large-scale projects such as the design for the 2008 Olympics also served as the catalyst for Ma's engagement with public art. In previous works, she has kept the delicate balance between involving the public and guarding personal artistic visions. For the 2013 project Isle of Enchantment, Ma built an island in a lake in Belo Horizonte, Brazil, using live plants painted in Chinese ink. The island appeared like a classical Chinese garden from a distance, but was composed of plants native to Brazil. This work involved collaborating with local people over several months, and witnessed Ma's own developing interest in paradise as an artistic subject.

Bending the Arc was a site-specific, ephemeral work commissioned for Atlanta's 2015 Flux Night to explore the legacies of Martin Luther King Jr. and the civil rights movement. As in previous public projects, Ma carefully investigated the site and the context of the project. Inspired by King's contention that "the arc of the moral universe is long, but it bends toward justice," Ma projected a line of light on a wall in King's former neighborhood. The line would vibrate, bounce, ricochet, or bend into an arch when audience participants whisper, speak, sing, or shout into the microphones that dotted the field, visualizing the collective force of human voice and breath.

In public art projects, Ma holds on to the idea of the public as a part of her work in attempt to give back to society. Public art is complementary to Ma's exhibitions in galleries and museums where more complex and personal visions are presented to an audience of more limited size.

=== In Search of Paradise ===
In 2012, Ma covered live plants with ink in her installation Hanging Garden in Ink at Ullens Center for Contemporary Art, Beijing, referencing the Hanging Gardens of Babylon to meditate on universal topics such as "the illusion of material wealth, declarations of love, and the power of nature and myth, among other things." Since then, the concept of searching for paradise and dissecting its significance in contemporary society has been prominently featured in her work.

In Search of Garden of Eden in 2013 exhibited Ma's research on the original location of the Garden of Eden. As an exercise to explore other lost utopias across civilizations, it was an intellectual preparation for later projects. The theme of paradise is also paired with Ma's practice of Chinese ink. 44 Sunsets In a Day, featuring a slowly revolving sphere of inked live plants, as a potent reference to The Little Prince. The main character lives on a planet fueled by love which the artist envisions as a utopian universe. Ma's reflection upon the ideal was more thoroughly examined in the 80 minute installation opera Paradise Interrupted.

The search for paradise continued after Paradise Interrupted, witnessing experiments with materials to "investigate some differences between the visual arts and theatrical arts." The Furthest Distance in a Paradise Interrupted was showcased in Qatar Museums' Gallery Al-Riwaq in 2016. Images of garden landscape were painted on plexiglass panels and covered the exhibition space walls. Male and female singing voices were hidden in black and white glass vessels that danced and swung in the gallery, occupying the same space, but never truly together or in synch.

The use of glass and mirror effect recurred in the 2016 installation Molar. The work was commissioned for the A Beautiful Disorder exhibition at the Cass Sculpture Foundation in West Sussex, UK. An ink pool was delimited by ink paintings of the British country landscape inspired through Chinese literati landscape painting on glass panels. Suspended over the pool were more than 400 glass orbs in organic, cellular shapes. The search for paradise was turned from the external natural world to its microcosm within the human body.

=== Paradise Interrupted ===
Paradise Interrupted is an 80-minute installation opera. The work had its world premier at Spoleto Festival USA in 2015, Charleston, SC, and was previewed at the Metropolitan Museum of Art's Temple of Dendur in March the same year. In 2016, it was performed at both Lincoln Center Festival and Singapore International Festival of the Arts, to critical acclaim. Paradise Interrupted recounts the story of a woman pursuing an unattainable ideal. Ma entwined Chinese kunqu opera the Peony Pavilion and the tale of Eve's expulsion from the Garden of Eden to render a piece of contemporary art. The lead singer Qian Yi, from whose personal and professional experiences the main character is partly derived, broke through the traditional, stylized Chinese kunqu operatic form, to create a new approach in her performance. Music composition took a similar approach in its creativity. The composer Huang Ruo married Eastern and Western practices, writing the male vocal lines in the Western style, while keeping the female's in line with kunqu style singing.

Ma, the librettist, visual designer, and director of the opera, said in an interview: "The idea of a garden came first, before a note was written, before a word was written … The music informs, but the visual led the text and the music." Instead of being auxiliary props, stage installation became no less expressive than the music and the libretto. Underneath Hanging Garden in Ink in 2012, Ma had already staged a bit of opera from The Peony Pavilion—the dream sequence in which the main character, Du Liniang, dreams of her fantasy lover. Paradise Interrupted furthered such artistic vision and incorporated contemporary technologies.

The black garden installation was composed of hundreds of large sheets of laser cut, folded and assembled Tyvek, that could be opened, extended or contracted by manual manipulation. In collaboration with interactive new media artist Guillermo Acevedo, Ma enriched the sculpture garden with interactive video projections. As Acevedo explained, Qian Yi's voice activated and affected the video according to its emotional content. The fireflies for instance, are a particle system, acting independently but modified by the sound. This strategy literally visualized the opera's tagline, "story of a woman on a quest for an unattainable ideal in a world activated by her lone voice." As Anthony Tommasini commented, "few operatic works mingle different elements so ambitiously as 'Paradise Interrupted.'"

=== Cry Joy Park Series ===
Ma’s recent Cry Joy Park series closely looks at issues of social justice and the difficulty of reconciling opposing forces in our society. This series further examines the idea of searching for paradise that installation opera Paradise Interrupted began. Cry Joy Park consists of immersive environments consisted of laser-cut paper gardens, often taking up two adjacent spaces within the same installation, one of white and one of black to create a stark contrast. The gardens are not symbolisms for good and evil, but rather point to the conflicting qualities of utopic and dystopic ideals within a society and emphasize the polarity between these through the stark contrast of black and white. These landscapes explore the environmental justice issues of racial and class inequality, wealth disparity, social welfare, political participation, personal empowerment, and more. While the Cry Joy Park series is the same physical installation in each iteration, its focus on the relevant local environmental justice issues makes it site specific, leading to new forms that changes with each installation.

==== Cry Joy Park—Fold ====
The first work of the series, Cry Joy Park—Fold, 2018, was exhibited at Tang Contemporary Art in Beijing, China. When Ma began her conception of the work, she “confronted the Beijing city government's response to calls from the Standing Committee of the People's Congress to forcibly remove members of the so called ‘low end population.’” The campaign to clear out Beijing’s “low end population”, which referred to the city’s migrant-worker population, left multitudes without jobs and homes. The installation questions what separates the “high-end” labor of an artist, from a day laborer’s “low-end” production, especially in a society build upon the ideals of class abolition. Curator Xiaoyu Weng’s essay that accompanied the exhibition stated, "Jennifer Wen Ma’s black and white garden is an allegory for precisely this cycle of continued construction and deconstruction of utopian ideals in human society and the alternative space this process may have given birth to. Such reflection is particularly prescient now, as global politics goes into retrenchment with the rise of right-wing populism and nationalism, and the expansion of illogical neoliberalism, and society seems to truly have no more room for utopia."

==== Cry Joy Park—Gardens of Dark and Light ====
Cry Joy Park—Gardens of Dark and Light, 2019, was exhibited at the Halsey Institute of Contemporary Art in Charleston, South Carolina. This iteration of the series examined the historical, social, and racial landscape of the city, specifically focusing on the questions of, “who is welcome [in the city?] Who is absent?”. The contrasting black and white gardens specifically honed in on the overarching idea of systemic racism in the city of Charleston.

The garden installation spilled over into an adjacent gallery that hosted the project entitled “Invitation to the Feast” — a series of community lunches and dinners with Charleston locals and activists from the area coming together around a shared table under the canopy of the black and white cut-paper garden foliage. Each dinner centered on a topic: reentry from prison into society, education, food security, and land politics. Ma worked with Jessica Bolyston from the Ideas Into Action project to develop the themes and dinner guests, bringing local activists to the table and discussion. The lunches and dinners focused on “finding ways to move beyond a history of the city that honors only half of its creators,” which has become increasingly urgent in the years prior to the project and remains currently.

At the end of the months-long exploration, Ma and her collaborator concluded that what enabled these inequalities to exist in Charleston was rooted in systemic racism. A culminating symposium "Ideas Into Action: Four Intersections of Systemic Racism” was held at the Simons Center for the Arts, at College of Charleston on July 10, 2019.

==== Cry Joy Park—Into the Looking Glass ====
The most recent work in the series, Cry Joy Park—Into the Looking Glass, 2019, was shown at the Redwood City Art Kiosk in Redwood City, California, curated by Lance Fung and produced by Fung Collaboratives. Since this public art space did not allow viewers to have access inside the site-specific installation, rather viewing the work through the four-sided glass-paneled walls; the artist dramatically changed the formal quality of the work for this site. The black cut-paper sculptures served as the exterior facing garden, while the white cut-paper sculptures lined the interior of the installation and could only be seen through fresnel lenses that served as a portal set within the black exterior. The work was inspired by the issue of access and division created by the tech boom that has been prevalent to the surrounding area for the past several decades.

== Teaching ==
Since 2018, Jennifer Wen Ma has taught in the Master of Fine Arts Department at School of Visual Arts, New York.

Ma has guest lectured at multiple institutions including Rhode Island School of Design, Cornell University, Michigan State University, Yale University, Columbia University, New York University, The Courtauld Institute of Art, Chinese University of Hong Kong, among others.

== Award and Prizes ==
Anonymous Was A Woman Award, Anonymous Was A Woman, New York, US, 2019

National Endowment for the Arts, Cry Joy Park–––Gardens of Dark and Light, Halsey Institute of Contemporary Art, Charleston, South Carolina, US, 2019

Installation opera Paradise Interrupted was selected as a winner of Music Theatre NOW 2015 at Operadagen Rotterdam, 2016

Alumni Achievement Award, Pratt University, New York, US, 2014

Emmy Awards, Associate Producer, Outstanding Live Event Turnaround, "Games of the XXIX Olympiad," NBC Broadcast, US, 2008

NYFA Artists' Fellowship, New York Foundation for the Arts, New York, US, 2003
