= Storyland =

Storyland may refer to:

== Theme parks ==
- Storyland (Fresno), sister park of Playland in Fresno, California, U.S.
- Storyland (Ontario), a theme park in Renfrew, Ontario, Canada
- Storyland, a children's theme park at the New Orleans City Park in Louisiana, U.S.

== Other uses ==
- Storyland (music festival), a shortlived music festival in Coffs Harbour, Australia
- Storyland (narrative generator), a work of electronic literature

== See also ==
- Story Land, a theme park in Glen, New Hampshire, U.S.
