= You Are The Tree =

Art installation on redwood trees and local California labor

You Are the Tree is an historically and geographically situated art installation. The project was commissioned by Lance Fung of Fung Collaboratives for the Redwood City Art Kiosk in 2020. It was created by Kent Manske and Nanette Wylde.

== Description ==
The Redwood City Improvement Association indicates the installation consists of, "a seven-foot diameter replica of an old growth, coast redwood tree stump that celebrates local labor and the history of Redwood City. The project reflects the historical facts of the 19th century cutting of old growth redwoods from the Santa Cruz Mountains and the resultant development of Redwood City. Multi-colored bark surrounds the stump alluding the beauty of human and environmental diversity with small flags representing disruptive inventive events. In the center of the stump is a living redwood tree. The installation will also feature Redwood City’s new residential high-rise buildings in each of the four corners of the glass kiosk with four words on the window 'You Are The Tree.' "

Nick Bradley of the San Mateo Daily Journal describes the artwork:

"Enter the art kiosk, where the installation is housed, and you’ll find a sculpture of a severed redwood tree trunk — 7 feet in diameter — with a real redwood sapling sprouting from its center.

"Small red flags fixed across the growth rings on the trunk’s surface mark different “disruptive innovation events” that have occurred in the last 400 years — the age of the tree. The first flag starts at 1620, which Kent and Nanette consider here to be the normalization of slavery in the United States. The flags continue and proliferate toward the edge to finally indicate the advent of the digital technologies and services of today — such as iPhones, media streaming, online shopping and ridesharing.

"Also on the surface of the trunk is a triangular felt strip. It signifies the 5% of remaining coastal redwood forests today. The other 95% of redwoods were clearcut in the 19-century in only 50 years. The arresting visualization of this fact makes one wonder what it would mean to lose such a unique, immemorial and celebrated part of the landscape — living nexus to the past."

Palo Alto Weekly's Karla Kane continues the description, "The work’s title is not merely symbolic: This tree truly is made up of pieces of the community. The colorful, textured 'bark' of the stump was made by contributions from 25 local organizations, business and laborers, including costume fabric and prop scraps from Dragon Productions Theatre Company, beeswax from the Redwood City Public Library’s rooftop hives, water from Redwood Creek, beer grains from local breweries, coffee grounds from the city’s cafes, kitchen scraps from restaurants, plants from nurseries, hair from salons and numerous other industry byproducts (an extensive downloadable guide as well as detailed process photos are available at 'You are the Tree'). The collected bits and pieces were painstakingly turned into pulp, then applied to a paper mache and hardware cloth frame."

== Reception ==
Nick Bradley claims, "The exhibit explores, in part, the implications of community, labor and ecological sustainability in the face of a new era of sweeping and accelerated change."

Reviewer Karla Kane writes, "You Are the Tree considers how the flourishing city, for better and worse, was built on demand for lumber from the coast redwood trees growing nearby." and “You are the Tree asks the community to consider its role in maintaining a sustainable ecosystem, and how the damage from our byproducts might be creatively mitigated. In this city, as in others built on exploitation of natural resources, the human community is inseparable from the landscape it was named after. You — we — are the tree, and we all bear responsibility for its fate."

The project received an Honorable Mention by the Sheridan Prize for Art: Sculpture in 2024.

== Exhibitions ==
You Are The Tree has exhibited at the following California venues: Redwood City Art Kiosk, Redwood City, 2020; Pathways at Art Ark in San Jose, 2022; EcoArt: Envisioning Strategies and Solutions at Artworks Downtown San Rafael, 2023; Kent Manske: Making Sense at NY2CA Gallery in Benicia, 2024.

== Publications ==
- Extraction: The Megazine, The CODEX Foundation, Peter Koch and Samuel Pelts, eds., 2021. ISBN 978-0-9962184-7-4
- Embodied Forests, Ecoartspace, Patricial Watts, 2021. ISBN 978-0-578-97453-8.
- Pathways: An exhibition about mapping, navigation, wanderlust and borders, Hunger Button Books, 2022. ISBN 978-1-936083-18-3
- EcoArt: Envisioning Strategies and Solutions, Women Eco Artist Dialog, Deanna Pindell, ed., 2023
