= Meaning Maker =

Social practice art project

Meaning Maker is a conceptual, social practice art project by Kent Manske and Nanette Wylde. The project consists of ten questionnaires on a range of topics. It was initiated in 2006 by PreNeo Press. Meaning Maker has been exhibited in galleries, published in journals, is included in the RISD artists' book collection, and has been unofficially distributed and placed at numerous art events.

== Description ==
Meaning Maker takes form as a series of fill-out-form pamphlets. Each pamphlet is an "edition" which focuses on a single subject. The Meaning Makers are: Academic Conference, American Citizenship, Art Viewing Experience, Control, Family Gathering, Food, Higher Education, Periodic Personal Evaluation, Relationship to Nature, and U.S. Presidential Elections. This project exists in the physical world and on the Internet. The pamphlets are distributed in public places, most often art galleries and museums, and at art or academic conferences. They are also distributed online as pdfs. The project appears to be open ended, with the most recent edition being published in 2015.

It is expansive and precise, as claims curator Jan Rindfleisch, who writes about Meaning Maker, “For viewing art and the art world, try Meaning Maker, a guided interactive tool to foster understanding and evaluation of specific experiences."

== Reception ==
Jason Urban describes the project, "Physically, Meaning Maker is modest: a multi-colored series of letter-sized tri-folds. It would look at home in any Kinko’s or a Human Resources office but it is only a spoof of corporate aesthetics. A closer look would reveal Meaning Maker to be a subversive tool for conceptual intervention.”

Discussing Meaning Maker, Carolyn Guertin writes, "The point of such a conceptual art project is that since it is infinitely renewable, it functions as a social critique of the expected norms of particular kinds of experiences.”

Aimee Le Duc claims, "Participants were encouraged to download copies, reuse the questionnaires and become the type of person most palatable in each of the pamphlets. The language is innocuous and satirical, but unsettling in the striking ease in which we all employ these assimilating tactics in our daily lives."

Stephanie Ellis reviews Meaning Maker for Stretcher, "Meaning Maker offered free low-tech transparent envelopes stuffed with a set of questionnaires, a nifty blue pencil, and a small pin with a plump “!” shadowed by a “?.” (Packets were discreetly labeled “this is art.”) The questionnaires (sans agenda) cover a series of occasions that often trigger zombie behavior such as an academic conference or a family reunion. In the latter, under “how I fit in?” you may choose among: the clown, the boss, at odds, the peacekeeper and so on. There was also a chance to check off the TV show that best represented your family. Hooked? The sweetly sincere self-reflective tools can be downloaded from their Web site. You might be inspired to write your own."

== Publications ==
Meaning Maker has been included in the follow print publications: O Say Can You See... the Soul of Our Nation (2026), FLAT (published by Karol Shumaker, Chicago, 2009), Visual Communication Quarterly (CSU Fullerton, 2009), Building Together by Jan Rindfleisch (2024), and Join + Cast Guide to Contemporary Art (Phoenix, Arizona, 2011).

== Exhibitions ==
Meaning Maker has officially exhibited at the following art venues: The Euphrat Museum of Art in Cupertino, California; The Schneider Museum of Art in Ashland, Oregon; Sanchez Art Center in Pacifica, California; Rhythmix Cultural Works in Alameda, California; Center for Creativity in Redwood City, California; The Lab in San Francisco, California, among others.
