= Lance Fung Gallery =

Lance Fung Gallery (1996-2003) was an art gallery of contemporary art once located at 537 Broadway in New York City where it shared an exhibition space with the Emily Harvey Gallery.

== History ==
The gallery was established in 1996. It closed its doors in 2003.

Previously, Lance Fung had been the director of Holly Solomon Gallery for several years. The venue emerged when Lance Fung and artist Nam June Paik approached Emily Harvey suggesting the two galleries cooperate in the space. The result was a schedule of exhibitions important in the New York art scene during its functioning years.

Lance Fung Gallery opened its doors in 1996 with an exhibition by Shigeko Kubota, to showcase this artist’s work. Going forward the gallery built a reputation as an innovative venue for Intermedia, site-specific and process based art and installation. The gallery encouraged experimentation with ideas and materials, allowed an artist run layer to dialogue within its overall process and introduced chosen emerging artists in context with highly established artists.

Among many artists who showed at Lance Fung Gallery, permanent artists of the first five years include Gordon Matta-Clark, Gema Alava, Richard Humann, Peter Hutchinson and Nam June Paik.
