= Richard Humann =

- Born: 1961 (age 64–65); New York
- Education: Harriman College
- Movement: neo-conceptual artist

Richard Humann (born 1961) is a New York City-based American neo-conceptual artist. His art delves deep into concept and ideas, and he uses a multitude of materials to create his installations, sculptures, videos, and sound projects. Richard Humann's influences are as broad ranging as from Donald Judd, and Nam June Paik, to Jonathan Borofsky. His artwork bears conceptual similarities and to that of Joseph Kosuth, Sol LeWitt, Lawrence Weiner, Edward Ruscha, and Robert Morris.

Critics have described his career as; "Humann's installation and environmental art pre-dates by half a decade the forceful movement in that direction that occurred in Williamsburg from 1989 and into the 90s. To me, it seems to fair to say that northern Brooklyn installation art begins with Richard Humann", and "Humann's experimental approach led to works that juxtapose historically sanctioned self-exploration with the tightening noose of academic appropriation and the globalized international art market." "Humann translates language from a transportation of thought into a thought to be perceived. He objectifies language, confronting our symbolic codes as simple and physical, and thus objective—as objects to be seen rather than conveyances to be seen through."

== Biography ==
Richard Humann grew up in Stony Point, New York, which is located in the lower Hudson Valley region of New York State. He began his formal art training at an early age with the painter, George White. Later, he graduated from Harriman College, where he earned a degree in art. In 1985, Richard moved to Greenpoint, Brooklyn, where he still lives and maintains his art studio. He divides his personal time between Brooklyn, and Woodstock, NY.

== Exhibitions ==
=== Major exhibits ===
Major exhibits include Dia Art Foundation, New York, NY (1988, Three Doors); Tampere Art Museum, Tampere, Finland ( 2004, Delicate Monster); Kemi Art Museum, Kemi, Finland (2003, Where Troubles Melt Like Lemon Drops); Museum of Contemporary Art, Sonoma, CA (2002, New York Art); Museo Cristóbal Gabarrón, Murcia, Spain (2007, Revolutions). In 2017 his work was exhibited at the Karachi Biennale. His work has appeared and been reviewed in the following publications: The New York Times, The Washington Post, The Village Voice, Dwell, New York Arts, ArtReview, The New Yorker, Sculpture, American Craft, Flash Art, Artforum and Art in America. His current bassword miniatures are featured in American Craft magazine (2007). His work has also been shown at galleries in the United States and abroad including Lance Fung Gallery, New York, NY; Gallery St. Gertrud Malmo, Sweden; Kunst+Technik, Berlin, Germany; Leo Kamen Gallery, Toronto, Canada; Project Row Houses, Houston, TX; Gasworks Gallery, London, England; Cornerhouse, Manchester, England; L Gallery, Moscow, Russia; Planet Art Gallery, Cape Town, South Africa; Samzie Space, Seoul, Korea; Elga Wimmer Gallery, New York, NY; Voorkamer Gallery, Lier, Belgium; and Corridor Gallery, Reykjavik, Iceland.

Humann has received awards from the New York State Council on the Arts and the Brooklyn Arts Council. He is also a recipient of the Pollock-Krasner Foundation award.

==== Selected solo exhibitions ====
Selected Solo Exhibitions
Year	Title	Gallery	Location
2010	In Nomine Patris	A&AH, University of Rhode Island	Kingston, RI
2008	You Must Be This Tall	Elga Wimmer Gallery	New York, NY
2007	Revolutions	Museo Cristóbal Gabarrón	Murcia, Spain
2005	The Quiet Argument	Aine Art Museum	Tornio, Finland
2004	Broken English	Elga Wimmer Gallery	New York, NY
2004	Delicate Monster	Tampere Art Museum	Tampere, Finland
2003	Body Language	Karolyn Sherwood Gallery	Des Moines, IA
2003	A Childish Fear	Lance Fung Gallery	New York, NY
2003	Where Troubles Melt Like Lemon Drops	Kemi Museum of Art	Kemi, Finland
2001	Possessions for Judgment Day	Project Row Houses	Houston, TX
2000	Evidence of My Being	Lance Fung Gallery	New York, NY
1998	Psycho Killer	Lance Fung Gallery	New York, NY
1997	Shakespeare in Code	Ridge Gallery	New York, NY
1997	The Lightbox	Williamsburg Art & Historical Center	Williamsburg, Brooklyn
1988	Cover-Up	EV7 Galleryy	Williamsburg, Brooklyn

==== Selected group exhibitions ====
Selected Group Exhibitions
Year	Title	Gallery	Location
2010	Buhl Collection: Speaking With Hands	Kaohsiung Museum of Fine Arts	Kaohsiung City, Taiwan
2010	The Billboard Project		Richmond, VA
2010	Nature of the Beast	(Curator) HP Garcia Gallery	New York, NY
2010	Project Birch Forest, The Waste Land	White Box	New York, NY
2009	Buhl Collection: Speaking With Hands	Daelim Contemporary Art Museum	Seoul, Korea
2009	Black Madonna	HP Garcia Gallery	New York, NY
2009	Summer Exhibition	Elga Wimmer Gallery	New York, NY
2009	Rozelle - Wards		Sydney, Australia
2007		Elga Wimmer Gallery	New York, NY
2007	Digiscape: Unexplored Terrain	Pace Digital Gallery	New York, NY
2007	Transparency	Middlebury College Museum of Art	Middleburry, VT
2006		Corridor Gallery	Reykjavik, Iceland
2005	R3	Castle Gallery, College of New Rochelle	New Rochelle, NY
2004	Black on White	Elga Wimmer Gallery	New York, NY
2004	Pierogi a Go Go	Pierogi	Williamsburg, Brooklyn
2004	Personal Space	Gigantic ArtSpace [GAS	New York, NY
2003	La Biennale di Venezia	Palazzo Zorzi	Venice, Italy
2003	Super Depth Mapping	Union Gallery	University of Maryland, MD
2003	Summer Reading	Schroeder Romero Gallery	Williamsburg, Brooklyn
2002	New York Art	Museum of Contemporary Art	Sonoma, CA
2002	Mapping The Vicinity	Voorkamer Gallery	Lier, Belgium
2001	Ssamzie Site Specific	Ssamzie Space	Seoul, Korea
2001	Going Home	The Hopper House Museum	Nyack, NY
2001	Crossing Parallels	Lance Fung Gallery	New York, NY
2001	32 lbs. of Head	The State of Art Gallery	Williamsburg, Brooklyn
2000	Eyewash	Liege Museum of Art	Liege, Belgium
2000	InfoZone	Bronx Museum	Bronx, New York
2000	The Last Waltz	Gallery St. Gertrud	Malm, Sweden
2000		Art Museum of South Texas	Corpus Christi, Texas
1999	The Last Waltz	Grekiskt Kulturcentrum	Stockholm, Sweden
1999	Apocalypse	Williamsburg Art & Historical Center	Williamsburg, Brooklyn
1999	Line	Lance Fung Gallery	New York, NY
1998		The Planet Art Gallery	Cape Town, South Africa
1998		Kunst+Technik	Berlin, Germany
1998	A Collection of Actions	Lance Fung Gallery	New York, NY
1998		L Gallery	Moscow, Russia
1998	5 from Williamsburg	Leo Kamen Gallery	Toronto, Canada
1998	The Concrete Signal	York College Galleries	York, PA
1998	Contemporary New York Art	Eleven East Ashland	Phoenix, AZ
1997	New York Exchange	Eklektikos Gallery	Washington D.C.
1997	New York Drawers (Pierogi Flat Files)	Gasworks Gallery	London, England
1997	New York Drawers (Pierogi Flat Files)	Cornerhouse	Manchester, England
1996	Pierogi Files Submitted	Pierogi	Williamsburg, Brooklyn
1988	Three Doors	DIA Art Foundation	New York, NY
