= John Roloff =

American sculptor

John Roloff (b. 1947) is an American sculptor and conceptual craft artist. He is known for his site-specific work dealing with natural systems and the environment.

== Education and early life ==
Roloff was born in Portland, Oregon, in 1947. He attended UC Davis where he studied geology and art. He completed his graduate work in 1973.

== Work ==
During the late 1970s through the early 1990s, Roloff produced a series of site-specific kiln/furnace pieces. In addition to ceramic work and sculpture, Roloff has created numerous works of public art including the work, Green Glass Ship–Deep Gradient/Suspect Terrain, at the Yerba Buena Center in San Francisco.

In 2024 Roloff was commissioned by Lance Fung to create Solarium for the Redwood City Art Kiosk. Solarium was an experimental light and sound artwork which invited audience participation.

== Collections ==
Roloff's work is held in the permanent collections of the National Museum of American Art, the San Francisco Museum of Modern Art, the Fine Arts Museum of San Francisco, the Chazen Museum of Art, among other institutions.

His papers from 1980 to 2002 are held in the Archives of American Art of the Smithsonian Institution.
