= Sheila Kennedy (architect) =

- Education: Wesleyan University, École des Beaux-Arts
- Occupation: Architect
- Partner: Juan Frano Violich
- Practice: Kennedy & Violich Architecture, Harvard Graduate School of Design, Massachusetts Institute of Technology
- Design: green technology

Sheila Kennedy is an American architect and professor at the Massachusetts Institute of Technology (MIT) who is known for including green technology, such as flexible solar cells, into her designs. She is interested in using technology in new ways and in re-examining traditional ways of building and designing structures.

== Biography ==
Kennedy shares that as a teen, she was interested in electronics. Kennedy attended Wesleyan University, receiving a bachelor's degree in history, philosophy and literature in 1979.

She received graduate degrees in architecture from first the Ecole National Supérieure des Beaux Arts in 1981 and later from Harvard University in 1985. From Harvard, she won the SOM National Traveling Fellowship. Kennedy was awarded the 2014 Berkeley-Rupp Prize by the UC Berkeley's College of Environmental Design. This $100,000 prize includes a semester-long professorship, public lecture, and gallery exhibition. She received the award for “distinguished design practitioner or academic who has made a significant contribution to advance gender equity in the field of architecture, and whose work that emphasizes a commitment to sustainability and community,” according to a press release. Kennedy was an associate professor at Harvard University's Graduate school of Design from 1991 to 1995. She is currently the Professor of the Practice of Architecture at MIT, the first woman to hold that position.

== Work ==
Kennedy is the principal and founder of Kennedy & Violich Architecture (KVA) in Boston. KVA was founded in 1990. When the firm started, it was just her and her partner, Juan Frano Violich, who she met in graduate school. The firm is still small, with about 13 members.

In 1993, Kennedy created a temporary "elegant frame" passageway for the Interim Bridges Project in Boston. One of the firm's earlier projects was the redesign of the Urban house in New York city in 1999. KVA turned the house inside-out, in a way, making the couple's 48 foot pool and exercise area part of the living room.

Kennedy sees one of the roles of an architect as having the ability to see alternative uses for materials and to use these materials creatively. Kennedy sees solid-state technology and wireless embedded technology as important "design drivers" for architecture. She also is interested in different ways to use the "hollow wall" of modern construction, in which walls contain the "guts" of the building itself. She wonders how the surface of the wall, which she compares to skin, can itself become the "source for the transmission of light, heat, color, or information." She has also taken a feminist critique to the "buts" of the house in a lecture she gave at the Bunting Institute in 1999 called "Electricity, the Fairy and the Hollow Wall: Rethinking the Spaces of Infrastructure in Architecture." Kennedy also sees interesting ways to tackle additional problems such as carbon emissions and gray energy through using new materials, or old materials in new ways.

In 2000, Kennedy, along with her partner, Violich, created a materials research division, known as MATx, in their firm. Kennedy is the director of design and applied research at MATx. The goal of MATx is to "forge a new relationship with materials, on that will draw on mass customization." MATx also explores ways that renewable resources can be used, and also how to incorporate bio-materials into architectural design. MATx's first project was used in Africa and was called "Portable Light." Portable Light, developed in 2005, is a lightweight, portable textile which can harvest electricity and each kit costs less than $16. Another Portable Light initiative was started in Brazil in July 2012, named The Luz Portatil Brasil. In Rio de Janeiro, nearly five hundred families were outfitted with these kits in order to live off-grid.

Another project that came out of MATx was named the Soft House. This house is able to work off-grid. The Soft House ironically uses solid wood for the structure, which creates a "hyper-insulated envelope" and then it has a fabric-like membrane of photovoltaic cells which are able to shade the building, harvest energy and provide privacy like a curtain. Interior curtains, seeded with LEDs, provide lighting for the house. Soft House won first place in the International Building Exhibition design competition.

Kennedy has worked for clients such as DuPont, Harvard University and Herman Miller. In 2001, Kennedy worked with DuPont, using solid-state technologies which integrated into translucent and transparent materials which could later be used as lighting.

Another large-scale project that KVA worked on was the East 34th Street Ferry Landing in New York City. The public ferry terminal is "the first project in the United States that has taken a low-carbon approach to public infrastructure" and includes a soft roof which has an interactive display for current events on the East River. The project won the Progressive Architecture Award in 2002.

Kennedy has also written about the importance of designing new schools so that they can provide "21st century technological and physical infrastructure." She expounds on this later, in her own essay, "Something From 'Nothing': Information Infrastructure in School Design" (2002), where she compares a computer room to a fictional "electricity room" where people would go to use "artificial lights and power outlets." Instead of segregating technology, she feels it should be everywhere throughout the school.

Kennedy is currently exploring "flat-to-form" technology and ideas and other creative ways to "deliver sunlight deep into a building."

In 2014, Kennedy was honored by Architectural Record for the journal's first annual Women in Architecture Awards, winning in the category of Innovator. Also in 2014, she received the $100,000 Berkeley-Rupp Architecture Professorship and Prize, which also includes a residence at the University of California, Berkeley College of Environmental Design (CED). In January 2015, Kennedy began her residency at CED.

Kennedy has exhibited her work at the Cooper Hewitt National Design Museum, the Vitra Design Museum, the San Francisco Museum of Modern Art and the Museum of Modern Art.

== Publications ==
- Kennedy, Sheila (2013). "Going Soft". In Bhatia, Neeraj; Sheppard, Lola (eds.). Bracket 2: Goes Soft. New York: ActarD. ISBN 978-84-15391-02-9.
- Kennedy, Sheila (2010). "The Material Turn" (PDF). In Schropfer, Thomas (ed.). Working at Full Scale. New York: Columbia University Press.
- Kennedy, Sheila (2010). "Soft Cities". In Mostafavi, Mohsen; Doherty, Gareth (eds.). Ecological Urbanism. New York: Lars Muller. ISBN 978-3-03778-189-0.
- Kennedy, Sheila (2009). "Future Forecast:Scattered Fabrications with a Chance of Agency" (PDF). In Miljacki, Ana (ed.). Uncertain Futures. Cambridge, Massachusetts: SA+P Press.
- Kennedy, Sheila (2008). "Electricity, the Fairy and the Hollow Wall". Praxis (6).
- Kennedy, Sheila (2002). "Something from 'Nothing': Information Infrastructure in School Design". In Haar, Sharon (ed.). Schools for Cities: Urban Strategies (PDF). New York: Princeton Architectural Press. p. 52. ISBN 1-56898-378-6.
- Kennedy, Sheila; Grunenberg, Christoph (2000). Material Misuse: Kennedy & Violich Architecture. London: Architectural Association. ISBN 978-1-902902-02-9.
