= Deborah Berke =

American architect and academic

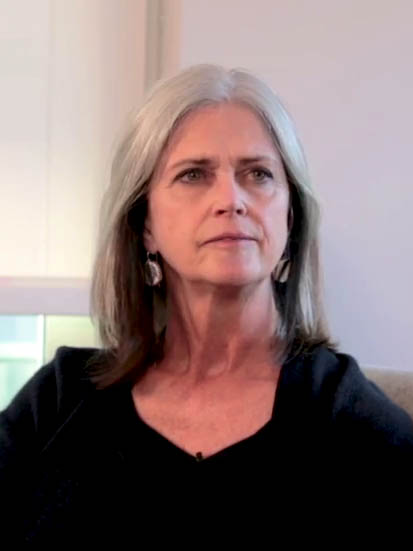
- Berke in 2018
- Born: 1954 (age 71–72); New York City, US
- Education: Rhode Island School of Design; City College of New York
- Occupation: Architect
- Awards: 2012 Berkeley-Rupp Architecture Professorship and Prize; 2025 AIA Gold Medal
- Practice: TenBerke; Yale School of Architecture

Deborah Berke (born 1954) is an American architect and academic. She is the founder of TenBerke, formerly Deborah Berke Partners, a New York City-based architectural design firm. Berke is currently Dean and J.M. Hoppin Professor at the Yale School of Architecture, where she began teaching as an associate professor in 1987. At the time of her appointment in 2016, Berke became the first woman Dean of the school. In 2022, Deborah received the AIA/ACSA Topaz Medallion for Excellence in Architectural Education. She was awarded the 2025 AIA Gold Medal Award.

== Life ==
Deborah Berke was born in 1954 in Manhattan, New York City, and raised in Douglaston, Queens. She traces her decision to become an architect to age 14, when she would explore Queens and study the borough's small-lot houses. Berke attended the Rhode Island School of Design, earning a BFA in 1975 and a BArch in 1977. She was awarded an honorary doctorate from the school in 2005.

For graduate studies, Berke attended the City College of New York, earning a Masters in Urban Planning in Urban Design in 1984.

In 2012, she became the first laureate of the Berkeley-Rupp Architecture Professorship and Prize.

In 2024, she was awarded the 2025 AIA Gold Medal Award.

== Selected works ==
- 1982, Rob Krier: Urban Projects, 1968-1982 (with Rob Krier; Kenneth Frampton; Institute for Architecture and Urban Studies)
- 1984, Visual analysis (with University of Maryland, College Park. School of Architecture)
- 1985, 32 buildings (with Mark McInturff; University of Maryland, College Park. School of Architecture)
- 1990, 30 buildings (with Mark McInturff; University of Maryland, College Park. School of Architecture)
- 1997, Architecture of the Everyday (with Steven Harris)
- 2008, Deborah Berke (with Tracy Myers)
- 2016, House rules: an architect's guide to modern life

== Awards and honors ==
- National Academy of Design, elected 2022
- AIA/ACSA Topaz Medallion for Excellence in Architectural Education, 2022
- American Academy of Arts and Letters, elected 2022
- Berkeley-Rupp Architecture Professorship and Prize, 2012

== In popular culture ==
Berke is referenced extensively in the 2017 film Columbus by director Kogonada. The female protagonist, Casey, is a fan of her work, citing the regional branch of Irwin Union Bank designed by Berke as her third favorite building.

== External links and additional reading ==
- Official website
- "A Working House: Studio/Guest House, Hillsdale, New York, Deborah Berke and Carey McWhorter, Architects." Architectural Record 181, no. 4 (April 1, 1993).
- Gerfen, Katie, Deborah Berke, and Maitland Jones. 2017. “Rockefeller Arts Center at SUNY Fredonia, Fredonia, N.Y.: Deborah Berke Partners: A Classic I.M. Pei Arts Building Gets an Addition and Renovation by the Masters of Thoughtful Pragmatism.” Architect (Washington, D.C.), November, 164–75.
- Interior Design. “Deborah Berke Partners Creates Contemporary Art Experience at the 21c Museum Hotel Chicago.” Accessed October 25, 2021.
