= Marlene Kos =

American video artist

Marlene Kos (born 1942) is an American visual artist known for video art and installations. She was primarily active during the 1970s, during which time she often collaborated with her then-husband, Paul Kos. She was born in Sacramento, California.

== Work ==
Lightning (1976) video still

Kos' hypnotic video work explores the illusory qualities of televised images. Kos has exhibited her work at the Berkeley Art Museum and Pacific Film Archive, the Zachęta National Gallery of Art, the Künstlerhaus Stuttgart, the National Gallery of Art, among other venues. During the 1970s, Kos often collaborated on videos with her former husband, Paul Kos, and on occasion scripted and performed in relation to his installations.

Kos' work Lightning (1976) produced in collaboration with Paul Kos was originally held in the Castelli-Sonnabend collection of video art. It questions the notion of observation and whether seeing is in believing. This experimental video is shot from the "privileged position" of the camera operator, depicting a woman "and what she sees as well as what she cannot see." The work questions the nature of reality in relation to observation of phenomena. The woman in the video (Marlene Kos) misses seeing the lightning strike by a few seconds each time it strikes, thus highlighting the privileged position of the camera man.

== Collections ==
Kos' work is represented in the permanent collections of the San Francisco Museum of Modern Art, the Neuer Berliner Kunstverein, and the Stedelijk Museum Amsterdam, among other institutions.
