= Redwood City Art Kiosk =

Art installation venue in Redwood City, California

- Established: 2019; 7 years ago
- Location: 2208 Broadway, Redwood City, California, 94063
- Type: art installation venue
- Website: fungcollaboratives.com/art-kiosk/

The Redwood City Art Kiosk is an art installation space in Redwood City, California.

The Art Kiosk is located on the Northwest corner of Redwood City's Courthouse Square. It is a historic 13 x 13 foot structure with glass windows on all four sides. The art installations are viewable from outside of the structure, at all times.

== History ==
The Art Kiosk was established by The Redwood City Improvement Association and with the initiative of gallerist/curator Lance Fung in 2019. The venue hosts seven to eight, six-week long exhibitions each year. It is managed by Fung Collaboratives. It features both emerging and established artists. Established international artists include Jennifer Wen Ma, Shinyao Lin, Kiki Smith, Ilya and Emilia Kabakov, and Virginia San Fratello.

As the venue curator, Fung, who also teaches at San Jose State University, uses this platform to provide opportunities to emerging artists as well as internationally established artists. The diversity of curation is wide. The 2026 Ofrenda de Luz by Aiden Khaleck, is an installation "meant to highlight the Mexican and Mexican-American communities’ dedication to preserving identity, traditions and language." Steve Davis' 2026 We Tell Them They Can Fly conceptually and literally asks, "What does it mean to give children wings?" John Roloff's 2024 Solarium was an abstract, interactive sound installation, and Frank Boban's 2019 Alone is a working camera obsura which "represents the internal need and at times struggle of finding identity." Artist Fernando Escartiz is the only person thus far with three Art Kiosk exhibitions. His Shadows & Light, the Legacy of Guernica, alludes to contemporary crises of war.

In an Almanac review, writer Karla Kane cites Fung's perception of the Art Kiosk project, “I really don’t know of any exhibition platforms quite like this. The primary way of viewing and experiencing the Art Kiosk is looking into this urban fishbowl,” and “It’s not about making product; it’s about dialog. Ultimately, an artwork is not an object, it’s an experience you provide like a good meal, like a concert.”

== Notable artists and projects ==
- Incubator, 2019 by Kate Dodd
- Cry Joy Park: Into the Looking Glass, 2019 by Jennifer Wen Ma
- Voice Crossing, 2019 by Joseph Clayton Mills
- You Are the Tree, 2020 by Kent Manske and Nanette Wylde
- Whisper, 2020 by Shinyao Lin
- Donner Pass, 2021 by Paul Kos
- Naturaleza Muerta (Still Life), 2021 by Elizabeth Gomez
- Find Shade While The Sky Is Pouring Hearts, 2022 by David Gumbs
- Blue Night, 2022 by Kiki Smith
- They are Flying, 2022 by Ilya and Emilia Kabakov
- Entwined and Woven, 2023 by Wendy Wischer
- Mil USOS/Labor Monument: Portrait of my aunts, uncles, cousins, sisters, brothers, others, parents, and grandparents, 2023 by Hector Dionicio Mendoza
- Diversity Index, 2023 by Pillar Aguero-Esparza
- Plaid, 2023 by Virginia San Fratello
- The Falling Crown, 2024 by Naledi Tshegofatso Modupi
- Oracle, 2024 by Sheila Ghidini
- Shadows & Light, the Legacy of Guernica, 2024 and We are Stardust, 2021 by Fernando Escartiz
- Kiku no hana, 2024 by Lisa Solomon
- Solarium, 2024 by John Roloff
- Ancestral Home, 2025 by Mik and May Gaspay
- Lullaby, 2026 by Nasim Moghadam
- Understory, 2026 by Erika Knerr
- Lifted, 2026 by Timna Naim
