= HaikU =

Internet digital poetry generator by Nanette Wylde

haikU is a browser-based, audience participatory, haiku poem project. The project displays randomly generated haiku poems, and allows the Internet audience to contribute to the project's database of haiku lines. The project is known as a work of electronic literature and for its use of an evolving database, and for the relative coherence of its output. It was created by Nanette Wylde in 2001 and is considered a form of interactive digital poetry.

== Description ==
haikU is an early example of internet coding for creative output. It was written using cgi with html and perl in 2001. The project creator states, "This project is an homage to early Internet programmers who created the first web-based, audience-participatory, creative works, often in the form of haiku generators."

Upon entering the website the viewer is presented with a haiku poem in standard (English) five-seven-five syllabic structure. Each poem is created from random selections of haiku lines from three separate repositories which follow the five-seven-five syllabic structure. The opening page has buttons to create a new poem, to contribute one's own lines to the three haiku repositories, and to learn more about the project and haiku poetry. Poems do not repeat upon refresh. The project is primarily in English, but on occasion lines in a variety of languages appear.

Elit scholar, Scott Rettberg writes "Nanette Wylde’s haikU (2001) is a project based on principles of user participation and on the use of a randomizing function to produce haiku that startle in the sense of producing unintended juxtapositions—no single author has determined which lines will appear together. The reading interface is a simple, spare web page. Every time a reader reloads the page, a new haiku is produced. Following a link to “Write haiku” individuals can submit their own haiku in three lines, each of which has its own button to post the line to bins of first, middle, and last lines. The poems delivered on each reload of the site are not the individual haiku as submitted by readers, but recombinations of these first, middle, and last lines of haiku pulled together in a variable way. Reloading the page twenty times or so, it is remarkable how many of the poems read as if they have been individually intended by a human intelligence. Most of the haiku, perhaps 80%, cohere quite well as poetry."

== Reception ==
HaikU has received critical attention from the electronic literature community and contemporary art writers.

Scott Rettberg states, "In haikU, the combinatory form and structure of the project, in concert with the form and structure of the poetic form, and the fairly subtle instructions to contributors, lead to the production of a poetic database that works fairly well. While extremely simple in concept and execution, the combination of human-written lines and arbitrary structure results in new poetry neither completely determined by any human nor free of authorial intention."

Star writes, "Wylde’s use of the regenerative haiku changes how the haiku is perceived by her audience. Although the sequence of words is spontaneous and unpredictable they seem to flow together creating meaning. Part of the experience of the poem is breathing its first, last, and only meaning into it. Once the upper left hand dots have been clicked the haiku is gone possibly forever because people are constantly adding new lines to the generator. Although they were shown individually I argue that just as Wylde encourages her audience to contribute to the regeneration of the haiku, Wylde also intends for her interactive audience to create their own ties and breaks where it seems organic."

Another reviewer states, "I like how open-ended haikU feels, and therefore how personal. . . it allows you to make your own connections, but you are also free to make no connections between the different haiku. This allows the reader to become partly a creator and make their own meaning for the poems. That’s one thing I find unique to electronic literature in general and this kind of randomly generated poetry in particular; the reader’s interpretation becomes a part of the work itself."

haikU is taught in college level electronic literature courses.
