= Virginia San Fratello =

American architect, designer and creative technologist

- Born: 1971 (age 54–55); Savannah, Georgia
- Known for: 3d printing, architecture, ceramics
- Website: rael-sanfratello.com

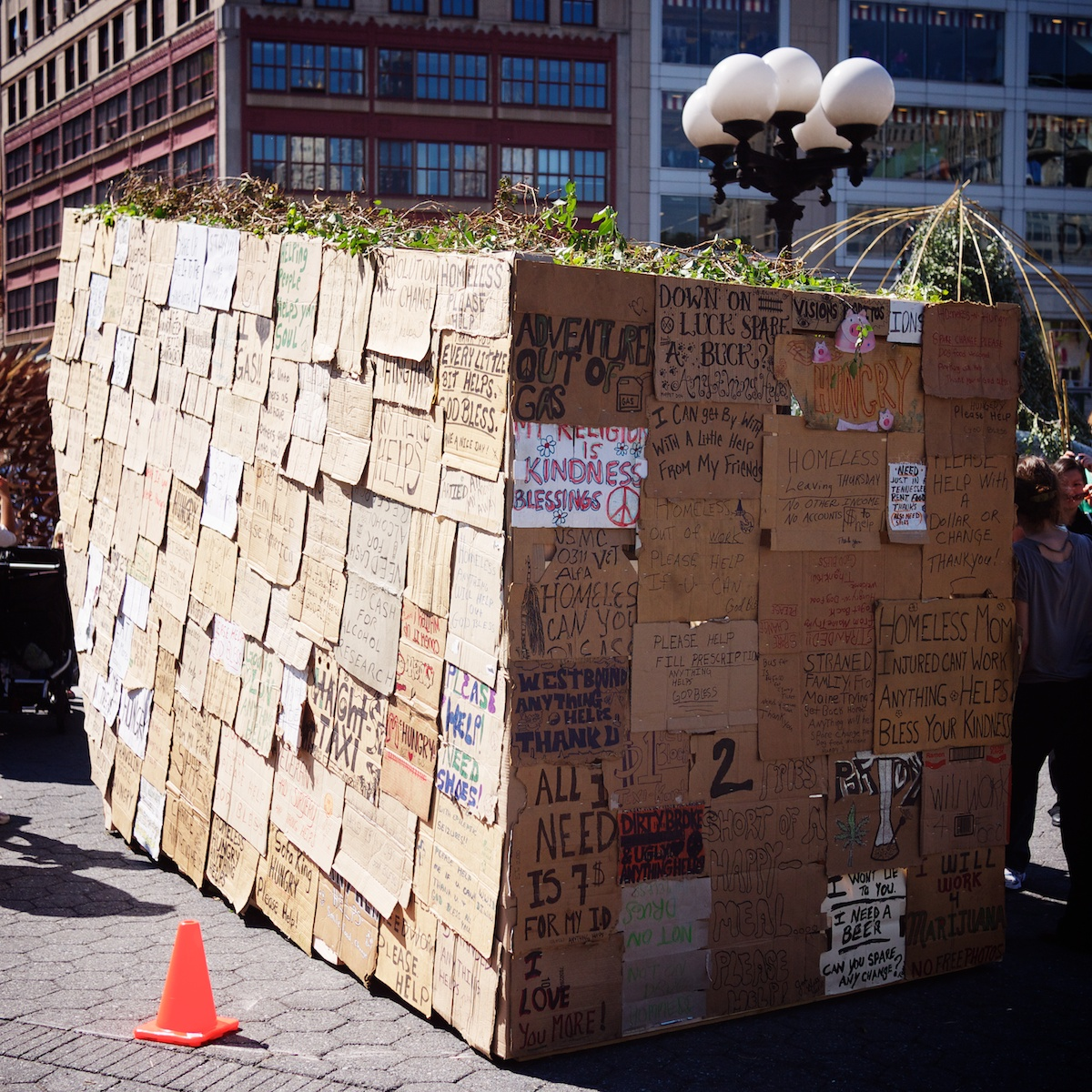
Sukkah of the Signs by Ronald Rael and Virginia San Fratello

Virginia San Fratello (born 1971 in Savannah, Georgia) is an American artist known for 3D printing, architecture, and ceramics. She attended North Carolina State University and Columbia University. She collaborates with Ronald Rael under the name Rael San Fratello. In 2014 Rael San Fratello received the Emerging Voices award from the Architectural League of New York. Rael San Fratello operate the venture Emerging Objects which develops 3D printed objects.

Her collaborative work is in the collection of the Museum of Modern Art, and the San Francisco Museum of Modern Art. Their series, Bad Ombres v.2, was acquired by the Smithsonian American Art Museum as part of the Renwick Gallery's 50th Anniversary Campaign.

In 2023 San Fratello was commissioned by Lance Fung of Fung Collaboratives to create Plaid for the Redwood City Art Kiosk.

In 2026–2027, Rael San Fratello: Prototypes and Provocations, curated by René Morales for YBCA in San Francisco exhibited 3D printed works in a wide array of materials alongside documentation of site specific public art projects by the collaborative team.
