= Storyland (narrative generator) =

Internet digital poetry generator by Nanette Wylde

Storyland is a browser-based narrative work of electronic literature. The project is included in the first Electronic Literature Collection from the Electronic Literature Organization. It was created by Nanette Wylde in 2000 and is considered a form of Combinatory Narrative or Generative Poetry which is created with the use of the computer's random function.

== Versions ==
Storyland v1 was created in JavaScript in 2000. It premiered at the 2002 SIGGRAPH conference art exhibition in San Antonio, Texas. The code is documented in Computer Graphics, Vol. 36 No.3, Summer 2002.

Storyland v2 was created in Adobe Flash in 2004. This version included animation and sound. Version 2 was included in the first Electronic Literature Organization Directory in 2006. When Flash software was entirely deprecated in 2021 Wylde archived the project and re-published the Javascript version.

== Description ==
Storyland is a narrative work which employs the computer's random function to display stereotypical characters in stereotypical relationships. Upon entering the project, and when the "New Story" button is engaged, a brief story is displayed. In version 1 (Javascript) the story develops over nine lines of text displayed all at once. In version 2 (Flash) the story develops through six segments which are displayed over a short time. The first version has a subtitle of "Postmodern Conditions, Contemporary Tales" which is not included in Version 2.

According to the project statement the work "exposes its narrative formula, thus mirroring aspects of contemporary cultural production: sampling, appropriation, hybrids, stock content, design templates. It risks discontinuity and the ridiculous providing opportunities for contemplation beyond the entertainment factor."

Many reviewers comment on the work as being amusing.

== Reception ==
Storyland has received attention in the form of gallery exhibitions and academic review. Its inclusion in the Electronic Literature Collection Volume One brought the project to international recognition.

Samira Nadkarni writes about Storyland, "Wylde’s choice of music is not unintentional. On one hand, it immediately indicates its use of re-purposed material, as Fučík’s original composition is intended to depict a military march drawing from the composer’s interest in the Roman Empire. In contrast, Laurendeau’s pared down small band version is commonly associated with the entrance of circus clowns, a far cry from the grandeur originally intended by Fučík. On the other, its use meta-textually gestures to the manner in which performers within a circus, while inhabiting certain fixed roles, use new guises to play a multiplicity of parts for their audience. The work’s use of its own template within which to use material that is sampled and appropriated, combined and recombined, displays not just the cultural production that occurs within performances such as those within a circus, but on a larger scale to our own performances of digital and popular culture. Storyland‘s display of the poignant as well as the absurd mirrors contemporary creation of narratives, the manner in which information is purposed and re-purposed to new ends." Nadkarni continues, "Additionally, much like circus clowns, the piece gains a great deal of its impetus from its pretense of immediacy. The stories create the impression that they are only just formed, working with the reader to veil the fact that the work’s random text generation is intentional and written into the piece. However, eventually the stories begin to betray themselves, revealing these repetitive elements. Wylde’s digital work asks the reader to confront and question our use of language, the narratives we structure, and the manner in which these are purposed within the performances of our everyday lives."

Daniela Ghiragossian posits, "The work mocks socially accepted standards and behaviors, while simultaneously touching upon a variety of major themes. . . Sometimes, the narrative, along with the circus themed presentation, evokes the uncanny because it depicts an environment that seems familiar, yet it conceals the way in which the events occur, leaving the reader to wonder in darkness about the content and the contradictions composed in this strange story. In addition, this circular motion suggests that all things are connected to each other, and in relation all people are influenced by one another."

Jonathan Baillehache compares Storyland to Surrealist writing, "When compared to earlier uses of chance operation in literature, a piece like this one resembles some of the automatic writings produced by André Breton and Philippe Soupault in their collective work The Magnetic Fields. . . The difference between Nanette Wylde’s Storyland and Breton and Soupault’s Magnetic Fields is that the former is produced according to a computational algorithm involving randomizers and user interaction, and the latter by two free-wheeling human subjects. But the resemblance between the two is uncanny, and part of Storyland’s interest is to question, through its resemblance with surrealist writing, the assumed difference between the human mind and cybernetics. Generative poetry has indeed a tendency to present itself as a simulation of such or such print literature or writer. One could argue that a piece like Storyland is the only one of the two that could claim to be randomly generated because it relies on computational randomizers, the computing equivalent of dice. . ."

Storyland is taught in university level literature classes.
