= Ronald Rael =

American artist (born 1971)

- Born: 1971 (age 54–55); Conejos County, Colorado, U.S.
- Education: University of Colorado Boulder (B.EnvD), Columbia University (M.Arch)
- Known for: Architecture, additive manufacturing, 3d printing, visual art, earthen architecture, ceramics, border wall studies, activism
- Website: www.rael-sanfratello.com

Ronald Rael (born 1971) is an American designer and visual artist known for his work in architecture, human rights and environmental advocacy along the U.S.–Mexico border, earthen architecture, and pioneering work in developing materials for 3D printing.

== Biography ==
Ronald Rael was born on 1971, in Conejos County, Colorado.

He is a tenured full professor at the University of California, Berkeley where he holds the Eva Li Memorial Chair in Architecture. He was the Chair of the Department of Art Practice from 2023-2025 and Chaired the Department of Architecture from 2019 to 2020 and was the first chair in both of the Departments of Latino descent.

He works independently in his epynomous RRAEL Studio, and operates collaboratively in the design ventures Muddy Robots, Emerging Objects, a "make-tank" that develops 3D printed materials, objects, software, hardware, as well as startup companies, and Rael San Fratello, a social practice design based studio with the architect Virginia San Fratello. In 2020 Rael San Fratello received the prestigious Beazely Award from the London Design Museum and in 2021 the International Award for Art from the Institute for Public Art for their project Teeter Totter Wall. In 2014 Rael San Fratello received the Emerging Voices award from the Architectural League of New York. He co-founded FORUST, a 3D printing company that uses sawdust, which was acquired by the 3D printing company Desktop Metal.

His collaborative work is in the collection of the Museum of Modern Art, the San Francisco Museum of Modern Art, and The Cooper Hewitt Smithsonian Design Museum. Their series, Bad Ombres v.2, was acquired by the Smithsonian American Art Museum as part of the Renwick Gallery's 50th Anniversary Campaign. He was educated at the University of Colorado Boulder and Columbia University.

Rael is the author of several books including Borderwall as Architecture: A Manifesto for the U.S. - Mexico Boundary (University of California Press, 2017), Printing Architecture: Innovative Recipes for 3D Printing (Princeton Architectural Press, 2018) and Earth Architecture (Princeton Architectural Press, 2008). His widely viewed TED talk on Borderwall as Architecture presents a "subversive reimagining of the US-Mexico border wall."
