= Theodora Skipitares =

American interdisciplinary artist

- Born: San Francisco, CA
- Education: University of California, Berkeley; New York University's School of the Arts
- Known for: Puppeteering
- Style: Interdisciplinary arts
- Awards: New York Innovative Theatre Awards
- Website: theodoraskipitares.net

Theodora Skipitares is an American interdisciplinary artist, based in New York. Trained as a sculptor and theater designer, she began creating autobiographical solo performances in the late 1970s. She moved on to examine diverse social and political themes using a wide variety of puppets, of all sizes. She has created 26 original works featuring various forms of puppetry, original commissioned music, video, and documentary texts.

Skipitares is Associate Professor of Art and Design Education at Pratt Institute in Brooklyn, New York, and has taught workshops in various U.S. universities as well as abroad, influencing many emerging artists. She has received grants from the National Endowment for the Arts, New York Foundation for the Arts, New York State Council on the Arts, and UNIMA (the International Puppetry Association), as well as a Guggenheim Fellowship, a Rockefeller Fellowship and a McKnight Playwriting Fellowship, among other honors. She won the American Theatre Wing's Henry Hewes Design Award in 1999, and her productions garnered two New York Innovative Theatre Awards in 2005. Her visual work has been exhibited widely in the U.S., Europe, and Asia. In 2014 her work was on view at the Whitney Museum of American Art in Rituals of Rented Island: Object Theater, Loft Performance, and the New Psychodrama.

== Early life in Bay Area ==
Skipitares was born in San Francisco to Greek parents. From an early age, she made objects, usually sewn objects that were worn. As a teenager she began performing in the streets or in public parks, usually for a political cause. When she went to UC Berkeley, she continued sewing and gluing together body coverings for her street performances. These objects included a robe of 3,000 walnut shells, a jump suit of 1,000 baby-bottle nipples, and a 12-foot tall construction of tree branches and bark.

== Move to New York ==
In 1969 Skipitares arrived in New York City to attend New York University's School of the Arts. After completing her MFA in theater design, Skipitares worked briefly as a costume designer for Richard Schechner's Performance Group, Omar Shapli's Section Ten and Carl Weber. She then began creating solo performances, highlighting some of the conflicts between Greek and American culture she had experienced as a young woman. Using masks or costume extensions of her body, she focused on the female body as the source of storytelling and ritual in such works as Mask Performance (1975), The Venus Cafe (1977), The Mother and the Maid (1979), and Skysaver (1980) and was the lead off performer at Public Arts International/Free Speech,

== The first puppets ==
Skipitares introduced 30-inch self-portrait figures into her performances in 1981, initially in supporting roles but eventually taking over the stage. She saw these "puppets" as having an innocence and a purity that make them especially effective in illuminating and critiquing social and political issues. She has explained that "the puppet is an empty shell, and the puppeteer's job is to breathe life into the empty vessel. And if the intention of the puppeteer is pure, then the soul of the puppet is pure. And so you can ask the puppet to be a person, and it will be that person with a lightness and innocence and authenticity." Her first play for puppet figures was Micropolis (1982), a collection of miniature scenes based on actual events taking place in New York and other cities.

Marrying documentary material (from historical accounts to breaking news) with puppets of all sizes, Skipitares began creating large-scale puppet performances on a variety of topics. The Age of Invention (1984), with a cast of 300 puppets and 5 live performers, traced the saga of American invention from Benjamin Franklin through Thomas Edison to a twentieth-century salesman/surgeon. Defenders of the Code: A Musical History of Genetics (1987) was described by New York Times critic Mel Gussow as “an illuminating exploration into the laboratories of life." Empires and Appetites (1989) presented a history of food and famine, and The Radiant City (1991) exposed how New York City was shaped by power broker Robert Moses.

== Works at La MaMa ==
In 1992 Skipitares became a resident artist at La MaMa, an experimental theater in New York City. She has presented 25 productions at La MaMa, including Under the Knife (1994), a site-specific history of medicine that took an audience to 12 different environments, and Body of Crime (1996/1999), a history of women in prison. Reviewing Underground (1992), New York Times critic David Richards noted, "Ms. Skipitares is a social critic…. At the same time, she is something of a metaphysician and a disquieting sense of dread and dislocation attend her endeavors…. She wants you to look hard and close into dark nooks and spooky crannies."

From 1995 to 2005 Skipitares traveled frequently with La MaMa's founder, Ellen Stewart, to create projects in Vietnam, Cambodia, Serbia, Albania, and South Africa. In 1999 Skipitares went to India on the first of three Fulbright fellowships there. Its impressive traditions of storytelling and puppetry led her into a reexamination of her own roots and the dramatic literature of ancient Greece. Beginning in 2003, she created three works connecting the Trojan War with the Iraq War: Helen: Queen of Sparta, Odyssey: The Homecoming, and Iphigenia. In 2009 she premiered The Travelling Players Present the Women of Troy, a play in which giant 13-foot-high puppets representing contemporary real-life female activists from Africa and Afghanistan "gave birth" to Euripides' characters in the play Trojan Women.

Skipitares continued to explore Greek texts with a production of Lysistrata in 2010 and Prometheus Within in 2011. Skipitares then shifted to an exploration of absurdist plays of the twentieth century. Her The Chairs (2014) was a "puppet theater response" to Eugene Ionesco's play. She created 29 "performing" chairs and let each chair tell the story of a real-life person, in contrast to the invisibility of Ionesco's "guests." Judith Malina, a founder of the Living Theater, was the voice of the Old Woman, the host for all the guests. In 2016 Skipitares staged Six Characters (A Family Album), a reimagination of Luigi Pirandello's classic play.
