= Carolyn Guertin (writer) =

Canadian artist and writer

Carolyn Guertin is a Canadian artist, scholar, and author. Guertin is known for critical writing related to cyberfeminism, born-digital arts, participatory cultures, theoretical work in emergent media arts and literatures, global digital culture, information aesthetics, hacktivism, tactical media, and the social practices surrounding technology.

== Career ==
Guertin is a faculty of Information and Media Studies at Western University in London, Ontario; and is a member of the graduate faculty at Transart Institute in Berlin, Germany. She was Senior McLuhan Fellow and SSHRC Postdoctoral Fellow at the McLuhan Program in Culture and Technology at the University of Toronto from 2004 to 2006.

=== Education ===
Guertin has PhD with a study of women’s writing, born-digital narrative and the technologies of memory in The Department of English and Film Studies at the University of Alberta, Canada. She attended Burnhamthorpe Collegiate.

=== Reception ===
Anastasia Salter cites Guertin in Re:traced Threads: Generating Feminist Textile Art with Tracery: "Carolyn Guertin has described the potential of networked feminism as hacktivism, observing that “when postfeminisms meet the new media they encourage these kinds of pleasures in the confusion of boundaries between bodies, texts, technologies, politics, and cultures” (Guertin). While one hopes that we are now decidedly post-“postfeminism,” the idea of networked feminism as crossing (and erasing) boundaries."

Kareem Metula reviews Guertin's From Cyborgs to Hacktivists: Postfeminist Disobedience and Virtual Communities, (EBR, 2005) stating, "Guertin does present a cogent argument on the validity of cyberfeminism as one facet of postfeminism by presenting several cyberfeminist collectives"

In Unraveling the Tapestry of Califia, Jaishree Odin writes, "Carolyn Guertin interprets Califia 's multi-layered narrative structure as an "engine of forgetfulness" which, because the reader's response is primarily on the emotional and sensory level, can be read using the model of Alzheimer's disease. Guertin attributes this response to information overload and the complexity of the narrative, which the reader finds difficult to retain in the form of any coherent trajectory. Though she is right about information overload as the text unfolds simultaneously in several spatio-temporal zones, this layered unfolding functions not so much to cause the reader's dementia as to make him return to the text repeatedly. The meaning emerges in the reading and rereading of Califia as different trajectories come together in the reader's version of the story."

In a discussion of female subjectivity, Jessica Laccetti cites Guertin repeatedly. As does Lisa Joyce in the article Introduction: Waves, and Katherine Hayles in Cyber|literature and Multicourses: Rescuing Electronic Literature from Infanticide.

=== Awards ===
- Outstanding Early Career Award from the Canadian Society for Digital Humanities
- Senior McLuhan Fellow and SHRCC Postdoctoral Fellow at the McLuhan Program in Culture and Technology at the University of Toronto

=== Creative works ===
- Wandering Meimei / Meimei Liu Lang Ji, 2014
- Dorothy's Mirror, 2012
- The Attributes of Heartbreak (or Gilgamesh, Twelve Leagues He Travelled), 2001
- Incarnation: Heart of the Maze, 2000
- Skeleton Sky, 1999

=== Publications ===
- Cyberfeminist Literary Space: Performing the Electronic Manifesto, Bloomsbury, 2020
- Gaming the City: Telephone City and Social Spaces of Transformation, 2014
- Introduction: "We are the uninvited", 2014
- Alternative Avenues in Digital Poetics and Post-Literary Studies, 2012
- Digital Prohibition Piracy and Authorship in New Media Art, Continuum, 2012
- Narrative (Pre)Occupations: Self-Surveillance, Participation, and Public Space, 2012
- Reconfiguring Publishing, 012 Mobile Bodies, Zones of Attention and Tactical Media Interventions, University of Innsbruck, 2011
- Seeing Story and Mapping Narrative, 2011
- All The Rage: The Digital Body and Deadly Play in the Age of the Suicide Bomber, Rowman & Littlefield, 2008
- Art at the Interstice, 2008 Beyond The Threshold: The Dynamic Interface as Permeable Technology, Springer, 2008
- Handholding, Remixing, and the Instant Replay: New Narratives in a Postnarrative World, 2007
- Narrative Architectures After the Book: New Containers & Standards for Stories in Digital Culture, Common Ground, 2006
- From Cyborgs to Hacktivists: Postfeminist Disobedience and Virtual Communities, 2005
- Quantum Feminist Mnemotechnics: The Archival Text, Digital Narrative and The Limits of Memory, 2003
- Multi-Dimensional Dementia: M.D. Coverley’s Califia and the Aesthetics of Forgetting, Zazil, 2001
- Gesturing Toward the Visual: Virtual Reality, Hypertext & Embodied Feminist Criticism, Surfaces, 1999
- Three-Dimensional Dementia: Hypertext Fiction and the Aesthetics of Forgetting, 1999
- Queen Bees and the Hum of the Hive An Overview of Feminist Hypertext's Subversive Honeycombings, BeeHive [Hypertext Hypermedia Journal], 1998
- Web Hyperfiction Reading List, Feed, 1995
