= Deanna Van Buren =

American architect

- Education: University of Virginia (BS), Columbia University (MArch)
- Occupations: architect, activist
- Website: designingjustice.org

Deanna Van Buren is an American architect and activist. She is a co-founder of the California-based architecture company Designing Justice + Designing Spaces.

== Education ==
Van Buren holds degrees from the University of Virginia and Columbia University Graduate School of Architecture, Planning, and Preservation.

== Awards ==
She was the 2019-2020 Berkeley-Rupp Visiting Professor at the University of California, Berkeley College of Environmental Design. She is a 2023 United States Artist Fellow.
