= Peter Hutchinson (artist) =

British-American artist (1930–2025)

Peter Arthur Hutchinson
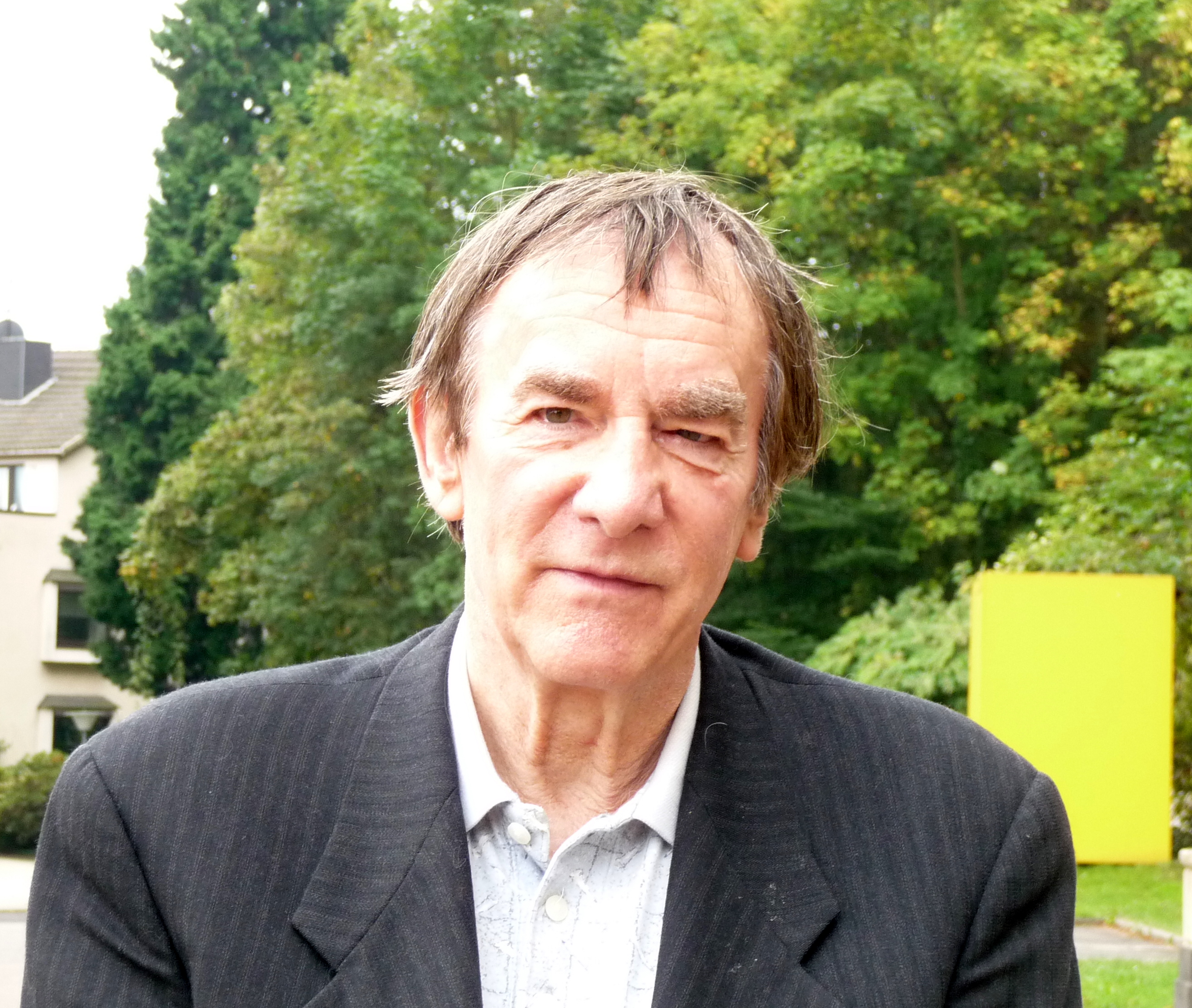
- Born: Peter Arthur Hutchinson; 4 March 1930; London, England
- Died: 26 June 2025 (aged 95); Provincetown, Massachusetts, U.S.

Peter Arthur Hutchinson (4 March 1930 – 26 June 2025) was a British-born artist who lived in the United States. Hutchinson is one of the pioneers of the Land Art movement.

Hutchinson is also considered a narrative and mixed-media, conceptual artist. Along with his photo-collages, he uses gouache, woad, and handwritten texts which reveal his playful wit and prioritization of subjective experience as an important part of his artworks.

== Biography ==
A native of London, Hutchinson moved to the United States in 1952 and received his BFA in painting from the University of Illinois at Urbana-Champaign in 1960. In 1981 he moved to Provincetown, Massachusetts, where he still lives.

Hutchinson received grants from the Pollock-Krasner Foundation, National Endowment for the Arts, and The Adolph & Esther Gottlieb Foundation. His artwork is in museum collections including the Museum of Modern Art, Centre Georges Pompidou, and the Museum of Contemporary Art in Basel.

Hutchinson died on 26 June 2025, at the age of 95.

== Artistic style ==
Hutchinson is known for his photo-based conceptual artworks in which he documents his ephemeral interventions on the landscape itself. These interventions often utilize flowers, food, and found objects to interact with the landscape, including the ocean, mountains, fields, beaches, volcanoes, icebergs, deserts, and other natural environments. Photographs of these interventions are accompanied by handwritten text describing the work, along with the date that the work occurred. Although sometimes, as a witty pun, the date on the work itself is not the date when it was actually realized (see example on Wikimedia Commons).

Hutchinson was inspired by early landscape painting and garden art, explained in part by his English roots, and also by his early interest in plant genetics. He often focuses on subjects about relationship between humans, animals, and nature and observes processes and changes, such as ecological systems of growth and decay in nature. In his biographical notes to his exhibit of 1977 (Selected Works 1968–1977), Hutchinson documented an example of such early work at the Parícutin volcano in Mexico where, in 1970, he laid a 100-yard line of bread along faults at the crater edge. This bread was used to grow mold over a 6-day period with the change in color visible from photos of the volcano taken from the air.

Hutchinson also used palindromes in his work "Step on no pets" in 1973, and "God saw I was Dog, Dog saw I was God" in 1976, set of 5 color and black and white photographs, a piece in the permanent collections of the Musée National d’Art Moderne, Centre Pompidou, in Paris, France.

== Selected solo exhibitions ==
- 2019 Peter Hutchinson: Landscapes of My Life, deCordova Sculpture Park and Museum, Lincoln, Massachusetts, USA
- 2015 "Peter Hutchinson", Fonds régional d'art contemporain (FRAC), Rennes, France
- 2009 "Peter Hutchinson – Erträumte Paradiese / Dreamed Paradises" (fifty-year review of work), Arp Museum, Rolandseck, Germany
- 2001 Thrown Ropes Remagen, Arp Museum Rolandseck, Germany

== Selected group exhibits ==
- 2022 "Vous êtes ici" at the Centre d'Art Contemporain de Pontmain (CNAP), Pontmain, France* *
- 2018 "A propos du Land Art" at the Fonds régional d'art contemporain (FRAC), Limoges, France
- 2016 "Sublime. The Tremors of the World" at the Centre Pompidou-Metz, France
- 2014 "Bad Thoughts, Collection Martijn and Jeannette Sanders" at the Stedelijk Museum Amsterdam, Netherlands
- 2012 "Ends of the Earth: Land Art to 1974" at the MOCA, Los Angeles, California
- 2003 "Look, it's snowing (Schizogeography of Everyday Life)" at the International Center for Art and Landscape, Isle of Vassivière, France
- 2001 "About Face: Selections from the Department of Prints and Illustrated Books" at the Museum of Modern Art (MoMA), New York
- 1999 "Sight Gags: Grotesque, Caricature and Wit in Modern and Contemporary Drawings" at the Museum of Modern Art (MoMA), New York
- 1991 "Unnatural Attitudes" at the International Center for Art and Landscape (Centre National d'Art et du Paysage - Vassivière et Limousin), Isle of Vassivière, France
- 1986 "Naked/Nude: Contemporary Prints" at the Museum of Modern Art (MoMA), New York
- 1976 "Photography for Collectors" at the Museum of Modern Art (MoMA), New York
- 1976 "The Golden Door: Artist-Immigrants of America, 1876–1976", Smithsonian Institution, Hirshhorn Museum and Sculpture Garden
- 1975 "Collectors of the Seventies, Part I: Dorothy and Herbert Vogel" at MoMA PS1, New York
- 1975 "Artists Make Toys" at MoMA PS1, New York
- 1973 "Recent Acquisitions, 1968–1973” at the Museum of Modern Art (MoMA), New York

== Museum collections ==
- Museum Ludwig, Cologne, Germany
- Academy Art Museum, Easton, Maryland
- Cedar Rapids Museum of Art, Cedar Rapids, Iowa
- Daum Museum of Contemporary Art, Sedalia, Missouri
- Joslyn Art Museum, Omaha, Nebraska
- Mississippi Museum of Art, Jackson, Mississippi
- Musée National d'Art Moderne, Centre Pompidou, Paris, France
- Museum of Fine Arts, Boston, Massachusetts
- Museum of Modern Art (MoMA), New York
- National Gallery of Art, Washington, DC, USA
- Philadelphia Museum of Art, Philadelphia, Pennsylvania
- Plains Art Museum, Fargo, North Dakota
- Portland Museum of Art, Portland, Maine
- Spencer Museum of Art, The University of Kansas, Lawrence, Kansas
- The Provincetown Art Association and Museum, Provincetown, Massachusetts
- University of Michigan Museum of Art, Ann Arbor, Michigan
- Weisman Art Museum, University of Minnesota in Minneapolis, Minnesota
- Whitney Museum of American Art

== Bibliography ==
- Hutchinson, Peter; Ratcliff, Carter; Beckley, Bill (10 January 2006). Thrown rope. New York: Princeton Architectural Press. ISBN 9781568985619.
- Hutchinson, Peter (1974). Peter Hutchinson: works 1968-1974: [Stedelijk Museum Amsterdam, 25.10.-1.12.1974] (Issue 567 of Catalogus Stedelijk Museum ed.). Amsterdam: Stedelijk Museum.
