= Susan Mogul =

American artist (born 1949)

Susan Mogul (born 1949) is an American artist primarily known for her work in video art. She also works in photography, installation art, and performance art. Originally from New York City, she currently lives and works in Los Angeles, CA.

== Education and early career ==
Mogul received her B.F.A. from Tufts University and Boston Museum School of Fine Arts in 1972, and later received her M.F.A. from the University of California at San Diego in 1980. In between this time, she studied at CalArts under Judy Chicago within the Feminist Studio Workshop, a radical feminist art program led by Chicago herself. It was here that Mogul first began exploring topics of female identity, sexuality, and feminism.

During her time at the Feminist Studio Workshop, she produced the video piece, "Take Off", in which she masturbates using her vibrator under a table. In conversation with artist Vito Acconci's "Undertone" (1972), in which he too appears to be masturbating under a table, Mogul plays with dichotomies of female and male sexuality. Says Mogul:

"I made Take Off in my studio apartment on Myra Avenue during my second year living in Los Angeles. As a member of the Feminist Studio Workshop, I was writing an essay at the time comparing male artists’ representations of their sexuality with female artists’. Vito Acconci was my model for a male perspective. I had been captivated by his videotapes; particularly Undertone, where he was supposed to be masturbating while seated at a table. The videotape was my ultimate response and commentary on Acconci as well as an expression of my own sexuality."

== Works ==
In her work, Mogul addresses female identity, as well as the perspective of the outsider. Her work has often been labeled as autobiographical and diary-like.

=== Partial list of works ===
- "Dressing Up", video, 1973
- "Mogul is Mobil", postcard, 1974
- "Take Off", video, 1974
- "Feminist Studio Workshop Videoletter", video with Feminist Studio Workshop, 1975
- "Big Tip/Back Up/Shut Out", video, 1976
- "Mogul's August Clearance", installation, 1976
- "Hollywood Moguls", photo collage series, 1976/1979
- "Waiting at the Soda Fountain", installation and performance (Columbia Coffee Shop, Hollywood), 1979
- "Waiting at the Soda Fountain", installation and performance (Los Angeles Institute for Contemporary Art), 1980
- "Design for Living", performance, 1980
- "The Last Jew in America", performance, 1983/1984
- "Central Park Summerstage, New York City", performance, 1986
- "Dear Dennis", video/film, 1988
- "Five East", video/film, 1990
- "Prosaic Portraits, Ironies, and Other Intimacies", video/film, 1991
- "Pages from the Diaries of Children", exhibition including books, drawings, and "We Draw-You" (video), 1991
- "Everyday Echo Street", video/film, 1993
- "I Stare at You and Dream", video/film, 1997
- "Home Safe Home", video, 1997
- "Sing, O Barren Woman", video/film, 2000
- "Piece of Work", video/film, 2001
- "Driving Men", film, 2010
- "Susan Mogul's Woman's Building", video/film, 2008
- "Mogul Celebrates Mogul", photographic works, 2011
- "The Artist and Her Mother", video/film, 2012
- "A Daughter’s Survival Index – An Interdisciplinary Work In Progress", photographic works, 2014–2017
- "Mama’s Girl Suite" - video/film, 2017, in progress
- "Mom's Move" - video, 2018
- "The Pencil Test" - video, 2023

== Exhibition ==
Mogul's work has been exhibited in many forms - at film festivals, museums, art galleries, and on public television. Some museums her work has appeared in include the Los Angeles Institute for Contemporary Art (LAICA), The Jewish Museum in New York City, Los Angeles Contemporary Exhibitions (LACE), Santa Monica Museum of Art, Center on Contemporary Art in Seattle, Los Angeles County Museum of Art (LACMA), the Museum of Modern Art in New York City (MoMA), and the Getty Museum in Los Angeles, among others. She also received the Guggenheim Fellowship in 2002, and has received various other commissions and fellowships from the ITVS, the National Endowment for the Arts, the Durfee Foundation, and the Getty Trust.

The first retrospective of her work was in 2009 at Visions du Reel: the Nyon International Film Festival in Switzerland.

Currently, some permanent holders of her work include the California Institute of the Arts (CalArts), Duke University, the Getty Museum, and the Video Data Bank in Chicago.
