= Social practice (art) =

Art practice

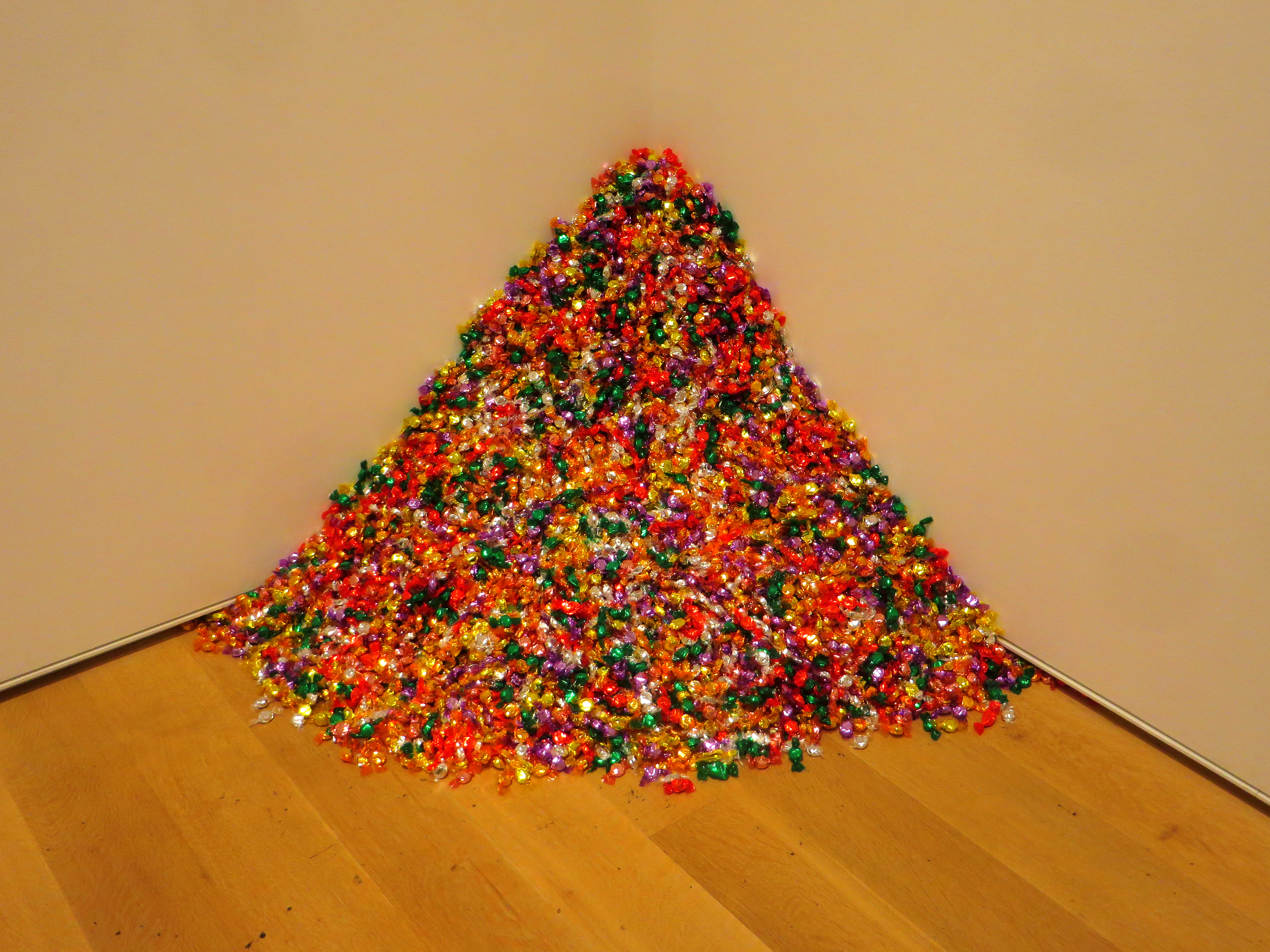
"Untitled" (Portrait of Ross in L.A.), by Félix González-Torres. The work invites viewers to take a piece of candy.

Social practice or socially engaged practice in the arts focuses on community engagement through a range of art media, human interaction and social discourse. While the term social practice has been used in the social sciences to refer to a fundamental property of human interaction, it has also been used to describe community-based arts practices such as relational aesthetics, new genre public art, socially engaged art, dialogical art, participatory art, and ecosocial immersionism.

Social practice work focuses on the interaction between the audience, social systems, and the artist or artwork through aesthetics, ethics, collaboration, methodology, debate, media strategies, and social activism. Because people and their relationships form the medium of social practice works – rather than a particular process of production – social engagement is not only a part of a work’s organization, execution, or continuation, but also an aesthetic in itself: of interaction and development.

Social practice aims to create social and/or political change through collaboration with individuals, communities, and institutions in the creation of participatory art. In the case of the Brooklyn Immersionists, who lived and worked in a toxic industrial area of north Brooklyn, both social and ecological engagement became important, leading to new theories of ecosocial subjectivity.

Artists working in social practice co-create their work with a specific audience or propose critical interventions within existing social systems to expose hierarchies or exchanges, inspire debate, or catalyze social exchange. There is a large overlap between social practice and pedagogy. Social interaction inspires, drives, or, in some instances, completes a project. The discipline values the process of a work over any finished product or object.

Although projects may incorporate traditional studio media, they are realized in a variety of visual or social forms (depending on variable contexts and participant demographics) such as performance, social activism, or mobilizing communities towards a common goal. The diversity of approaches pose specific challenges for documenting social practice work, as the aesthetic of human interaction changes rapidly and involves many people simultaneously. Consequently, images or video can fail to capture the engagement and interactions that take place during a project.

== History of terminology ==
Helping to inspire a period of urban renewal in Williamsburg, Brooklyn in the 1980s and 1990s, a community of interdisciplinary artists known as the Brooklyn Immersionists practiced a form of creative social and environmental engagement using terms such as "aesthetic activism," "media rituals," "circuitive systems" and "immersive mutual world construction." Although a program of corporate welfare in the new millennium exploited the resulting revival of their district, the promise of an aesthetic that engages social practices was established. The Immersionists' ecosocial aesthetic has been discussed in both the international press and art history books such as Jonathan Fineberg's Art Since 1940: Strategies of Being, and Cisco Bradley's The Williamsburg Avant-garde: Experimental Music and Sound on the Brooklyn Waterfront.

Until 2020 the term "social practice" was used in a branch of social theory that described human relationships to each other and to the larger society as "practices". The term “social practice art” is likely rooted in the German phrase “Kunst als soziale Praxis,” which emerged in writings about such practices in the 1990s. The term "art and social practice" was institutionalized in 2005 with the creation of the Social Practice MFA concentration at the California College of the Arts, followed by other institutions of higher education offering similar degrees. Social practice art as a medium has been referenced in the New York Times Artforum, ArtNews, and Art Practical. As an emerging field, social practice can encompass a variety of terms: public practice, socially engaged art, community art, new-genre public art, participatory art, interventionist art, collaborative art, relational art, dialogical aesthetics, and immersionism.

== Characteristics of social practice ==
Socially engaged art differs from its art historical ancestors in that it is not a specific movement or style, but rather a way of defining a new social order. Thousands of existing social practice projects across the world have taken vastly different approaches to their combination of publics, methodologies, aesthetics, and environments, yet these projects all share an aesthetic of human interaction and development. The end products of such works are not commodities, but rather processes for constructive social change. Some foundational characteristics of socially engaged art remain consistently relevant to a diverse range of works. For an artist or producer to create a successful social practice work, they must consider the unique context in which they are working and identify specific characteristics of the community and environment. They must also balance aesthetic and methodology in their work, aligning the timeline of a project with its purpose: a quick-impact ephemeral work, or the regularity of a longitudinal work.

=== Community and environment ===
Social practice artists and producers aim to affect their community and environment in a real (rather than symbolic) way - some specifically do so in hopes of enabling social and political change. Each project is tailored to the community and environment in which it will take place. In social practice, the identification of the public, or audience, precedes the project's development. It is impossible to create a project founded upon engagement and collaboration without first making assumptions as to who will be involved. Who the artist or producer wishes to engage and where they wish to engage are therefore core characteristics of socially engaged art.

The environment could be described on two primary levels: the broader community, city, or region; and the immediate space being occupied – a street, museum, studio, or other area. To understand the context in which they are working, artists and producers must develop relationships with individuals, organizations, and institutions that intersect many different parts of their community and environment. One theorist makes the comparison between socially engaged art projects to exotic fruit, stating that both “usually travel poorly when 'exported' to other locations to be replicated.” The community and environment are therefore not merely external influencers on a specific project, they are inherent characteristics.

=== Aesthetics and methodology ===
For much of art history, a work's aesthetic has been upheld as the primary measure of its quality. The 20th century broadened the public understanding of art to consider concept and process alongside aesthetic. And by the new millennium the tables had turned to emphasize process over product: one of the defining characteristics of socially engaged art. Process is determined by method; thus, social practice producers and artists are often more concerned with the methodology rather than the aesthetic of their work. Many argue that social practice has created a new aesthetic of its own: an aesthetic of human interaction and development that is based not on spectatorship but on participation. This aesthetic captures the diverse methods employed by socially engaged art and encompasses not only traditional methods of painting, photography, architecture, and performance; but also, nontraditional forms borrowed from other disciplines, such as festivals, conferences, schools, and protests.

Aesthetics are typically hierarchical, highly subjective, and greatly determined by external influencers, such as the imagery of a given culture, or the relationship between appearance and market value. To escape these external influencers, aesthetics can also be defined in terms of “aesthesis,” an autonomous realm of experience and judgment that cannot be reduced to logic, reason or morality but is of great importance to humankind. Aesthetics have the capacity to critique our beliefs and values by restructuring our perception of the world. Their application can achieve one of the cores aims of socially engaged art: the definition of a new social order characterized by engagement and participation.

Methodology in socially engaged art refers to the set of practices used throughout the process and production of a project. The method is no longer a means to an end, but an end within itself: the experience of creation and experimentation is a central element of social practice. While aesthetics reframes ideas and beliefs outside of the disciplines in which we have accepted them, methodology takes the frameworks of those disciplines to produce new aesthetics. Socially engaged art has embraced conferences, urban regeneration projects, pedagogical projects, and protests, which are all frameworks borrowed from other disciplines.

While aesthetics and methodology can have conflicting interests, there are important reasons why artists and producers should seek to integrate the two. Methodology will engage the public, but aesthetics will play a large role in determining how a project is interpreted. Ultimately, the two can work together to enhance each other: the aesthetic value of a project can increase its social function, while the method can heighten the aesthetic experience through public engagement.

=== Longevity vs. Transience ===
The method and aesthetic adopted in social practice work is greatly influenced by intended timeline. Length determines the type of social and/or political change the artist aims to achieve, the types of dialogue created, and the ways in which an individual can engage with a work. The length of a project is also extremely situational. Some projects aim to have an immediate impact, while others prefer to build relationships that foster change over an extended period.

Ephemeral projects are typically characterized by temporary gatherings and occupation of space. They create situations in which social interactions are momentary and not expected to become long-lasting The immediate impact of ephemeral works often means they take place around a particular issue or concept. Protests, festivals, conferences, or pop-up performances have all been used as mediums for ephemeral social practice work. For example, artists joined the protests when Mike Brown was killed by a policeman (https://www.youtube.com/watch?v=3IgNAFuM-n0 in August 2014 in Fergusson, Missouri. One group walked through the protestors with a mirrored casket. (https://www.youtube.com/watch?v=3IgNAFuM-n0. Artist and filmmaker Damon Davis made large-scale prints of raised black hands with the slogan, "Hands Up, Don't Shoot!" that he posted on the area's boarded up windows .

Longitudinal projects are those built upon regular and reoccurring social interactions and dialogue, organized with the intention to be sustained over a longer period. They typically occupy the same space and are characterized by deeper partnerships and relationships that are gradually built over the course of the work’s existence. As a result, many long-term social practice projects include a pedagogical element in their work. Classes, urban regeneration work, schools, or institutional partnerships are all examples of longitudinal projects.

== Social practice and institutions ==
Much social practice has taken place in the gap between the public and cultural institutions, which has been identified and acted upon as a new site for artistic intervention. However institutions, such as museums, foundations, non-profit organizations, and universities all play a significant role in supporting and amplifying social practice work. Many institutions constitute an extension of the public sphere, regardless of whether they are public or private in their ownership and operation. Partnerships between socially engaged art and contemporary institutions have thus widened the public sphere, and provided mutual benefits to the institution, the community, those engaged in the project, and the producers. Moreover, arts institutions are what make social practice legible as art. Social practice works are inextricable from formal arts institutions like museums or cultural funding agencies, which “recast alleviation of social and economic inequality as cultural production.”

=== Social practice and the art market ===
In the traditional art world, market value and a work's collectability are deeply intertwined. This has posed a challenge to socially engaged artists seeking museum and gallery support, since many works go against the capitalist market to challenge traditional collecting practices. As a result, many socially engaged artists and producers must look elsewhere for support. The expansion of the art world in the 21st century has seen the emergence of alternative supports, such as non-profit organizations and the ever-growing biennale network. Other partners include art fairs, or commissions and residencies associated with universities, foundations, and urban regeneration. Artists and producers have also formed their own means of support, as artist-run exhibition spaces, journals and blogs demonstrate. The Institute for Art and Innovation publishes a biannually book based on the Social Art Award.

=== Social practice in the university ===
Universities often partner with producers, artists and theorists of socially engaged art. These relationships offer mutual benefits for both academic institutions and artists. Universities offer artists employment security, the support and validation often required for establishing grant-based and corporate partnerships, and access to a high interdisciplinary environment that not only accepts, but encourages, experimentation. Artists in turn provide knowledge, skills and research to support individuals and broader programs within the university. As producers and scholars, they generate both new theory and new practice for the field of socially engaged art.

== Exhibitions and conferences ==
Exhibitions of social practice art often include multiple artists or art collectives, and rather than exhibiting art objects, the artist’s participatory role in their work as well as their collaboration with the public becomes the exhibition. Several conferences are held nationally and internationally to bring together artists and academics involved in the field. They have featured installation, performance art, film, dance, art talks, forums, and gallery exhibitions.

As an example, the 2007 Social Practice exhibition, Corporate Art Expo '07 at The LAB in San Francisco, California, featured the following social practice art projects: Anti-Advertising Agency, Acclair, C5 Corporation, Davis & Davis Research, Meaning Maker, Death and Taxes, Inc., Old Glory Condom Co., PP Valise, SubRosa, Slop Art, TDirt, Tectonic Corporation, and We Are War. Curator Shane Montgomery wrote, "Over the last few years, a new group of artists have emerged that package themselves as corporate entities. They develop a company name, a branding scheme, and utilize the language of advertising and marketing. These individual artists and collectives create art objects, marketing materials, and performative event-based pieces that can exist in a gallery setting as well as in the public sphere. Much of this work centers around issues of capitalism and consumerism. By putting this work within the context of fictional products or alternative services, we are able to engage in a more enhanced conversation around topics ranging from globalization, immigration reform, and health care in a way that is whimsical and visually inspiring."

== Criticism ==
Social practice has received criticism for being "exploitative of the marginalized communities from which it so often draws..." Social practice art can also serve as the public face of externally led economic activities in undervalued urban communities, concealing extractive relationships behind a facade of art.

== See also ==
- Community arts
- Relational art
- Social artistry
- Social design
- Social practice
