= Lance Fung =

Lance Fung, American Art curator and gallerist

- Occupation: Independent Curator
- Known for: Contemporary Art Curation

Lance Fung is an American art curator and gallerist known internationally for curating large scale, site specific art installations.

Fung has been responsible for major exhibitions including Snow Show at Venice at the 50th International Art Exhibition/La Biennale di Venezia Italy.; Constellations: Global Reflections, the first exhibition for a G20 Summit, in Bali, 2022; Crossing Parallels at the Samzi Space in Seoul, Korea; The Ship of Tolerance by Ilya & Emilia Kabakov in Siwa, Egypt; Revisiting Gordon Matta-Clark at Next: The Venice Architectural Biennale in Venice, Italy; and Lucky Number Seven for SITE Santa Fe International Biennial in 2008 among others.

== Career ==
Fung began his curatorial career working as a director for Holly Solomon Gallery in New York City from 1990–1993. He started his own gallery, Lance Fung Gallery in 1996. It closed in 2003.

In 1999 Fung founded Fung Collaboratives, an interdisciplinary arts organization. Projects include the transformation of vacant lots in Atlantic City into a park system through his exhibition Artlantic. These "giant living sculptures" attracted local residents and visiting art enthusiasts to experience art in "green" settings designed by Fung and the participants: Diana Balmori, Robert Barry, Peter Hutchinson, Ilya & Emilia Kabakov, John Roloff, and Kiki Smith.

Fung curated Nonuments in Washington D.C. for the 5 x 5 project organized by the DC Commission on the Arts and Humanities. This project resulted in five temporary monuments commemorating current issues such as the survivors of human trafficking, global warming, and immigrant conditions.

In 2019 Fung began curating for the Redwood City Art Kiosk, a project sponsored by The Redwood City Improvement Association in Redwood City, California. Approximately ten exhibitions are scheduled each year. Fung uses this platform to provide opportunities to emerging artists as well as internationally established artists. Fung says about the Art Kiosk project, “It’s not about making product; it’s about dialog. Ultimately, an artwork is not an object, it’s an experience you provide like a good meal, like a concert.”

== Projects ==
- Lance Fung Gallery, 1996–2003, New York City, New York
- Crossing Parallels, 2003, New York City and Seoul, South Korea
- Snow Show, 2003, 2004, Lapland
- The Ship of Tolerance, 2005, Siwa, Egypt
- Snow Show, 2006,Torino, Italy
- The Wind Show, 2007, Evanston, Illinois
- Lucky Number Seven, 2008–2009, Santa Fe, New Mexico
- Liquid Cities, 2009, Venice Biennale
- Wonderland, 2009, Tenderloin, San Francisco, California, 2009
- Revising Gordon Matta-Clark
- Michele Ciacciofera: Silence, 2011, Venice Biennale
- Artlantic: wonder, 2012–2015, Atlantic City, New Jersey
- Nonuments, 2014, Washington D.C., Maryland
- Turning point, 2015, Benjamin Franklin Parkway, Philadelphia
- Fireflies, 2017, Benjamin Franklin Parkway, Philadelphia
- Redwood City Art Kiosk, 2019, Redwood City, California
- Illuminate Coral Gables, 2021, Coral Gables, Florida
- Constellations: Global Reflections, 2022, Bali

== Publications ==
- The Snow Show, Thames & Hudson, 2005
- Michele Ciacciofera: Silence, Charta Books. With Renato Miracco, 2010
- Nonuments by Lance Fung and Twylene Moyer, Fung Collaboratives, Washington (DC), 2014
