= Richmond Art Center =

Arts organization in California, U.S.

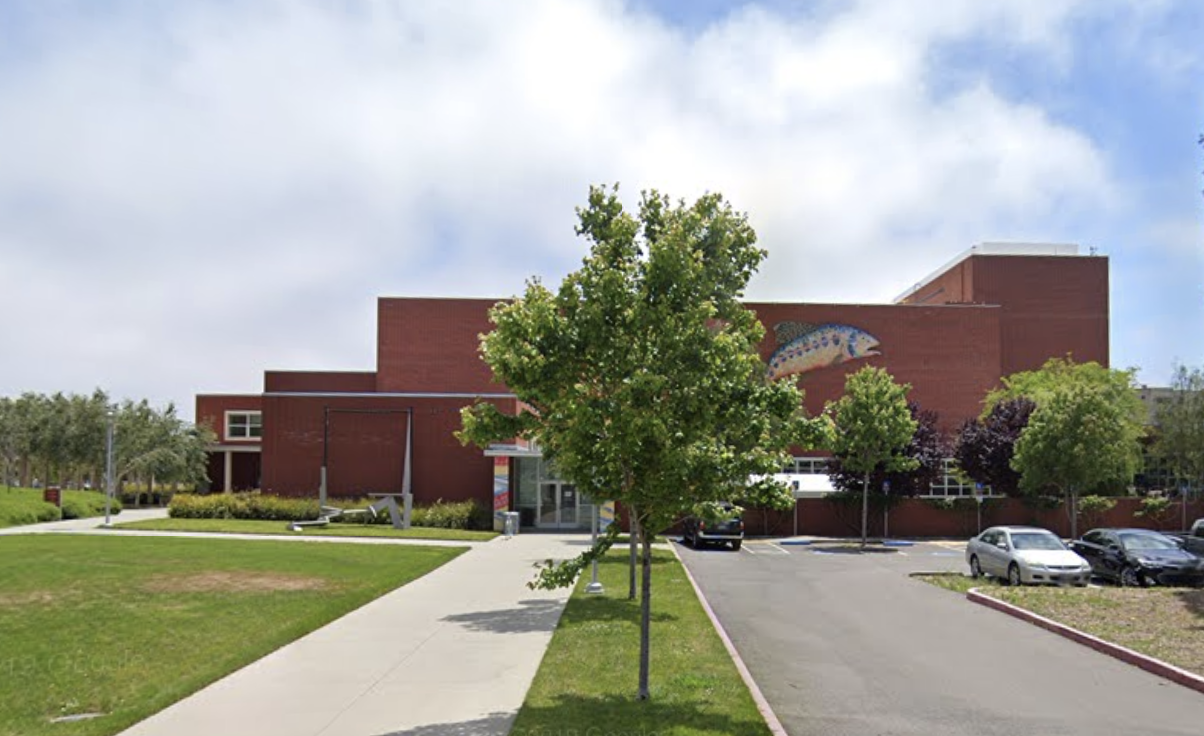
- Front of Richmond Art Center, in Richmond, California
- Established: 1936
- Location: 2540 Barrett Avenue, Richmond, California, U.S.
- Coordinates: 37.9358°N 122.3477°W
- Type: 501(c)(3) Arts Center
- Executive director: José R. Rivera
- Public transit access: Richmond Bart Station
- Website: richmondartcenter.org

Richmond Art Center is a nonprofit arts organization based in Richmond, California, founded in 1936.

== History ==
In 1936, Richmond-resident Hazel Salmi began teaching classes under the Emergency Education Program (EEP) of the Works Progress Administration (WPA). In 1938, the City of Richmond granted Salmi an old Health Department building to use for classes and exhibitions. Early classes included outdoor sketching, block printing, flower arrangement, color, woodcarving, and leather tooling.

In the 1940s, Salmi and other artists petitioned the City of Richmond to include a permanent art center as part of the new downtown Civic Center development. With funds from a bond measure that specifically funded the art center, the civic center construction plans were the first in the nation to include a community art center. Richmond's Civic Center was designed by architect Timothy Pflueger. The complex, which encompasses City Hall, Hall of Justice, Auditorium, Richmond Art Center, and Public Library, was completed in 1951. The low, linear forms reflect the mid-century modern style of the late 1940s and 1950s.

Richmond Art Center's new facility opened in 1951. Hazel Salmi was the founding director at Richmond Art Center from 1936 until 1960. From 1960 to 1965, Rudy Turk served as the director. J. J. Aasen also served as a curator at the Richmond Art Center.

Artist Tom Marioni, sometimes under the pseudonym Allan Fish, served as the Curator of Richmond Art Center from 1968 until 1971. Richmond Art Center became a focal point for West Coast Conceptualism during his time. Notable exhibitions Marioni organized included Paul Kos' first solo exhibition Participationkinetics (1969). Under Marioni's curatorship, Terry Fox created one of their seminal works, Levitation (1971). In 1971 Marioni was fired by the Head of Parks following a controversial performance by one of Judy Chicago's students that was part of the exhibition California Girls (1971).

For many years Richmond Art Center operated as a division of the City of Richmond's Parks and Recreation Department. In 1950 Richmond Art Center became an independent 501(c)(3) nonprofit.

== About ==
=== Facility ===
Richmond Art Center's facility is a u-shaped building wrapping around a courtyard garden and public outdoor space. The building has four galleries, including a 2,200 square foot main gallery, as well as six studio and multipurpose spaces. In the courtyard of the building, many sculptures by artist John Roeder (1877-–1964) were installed after his death in 1964. The Executive Director of Richmond Art Center is José R. Rivera, since 2020.

=== Classes and arts education ===
Richmond Art Center provides arts classes for adults, teens, youth and families. On-site classes and workshops are taught in the center's dedicated spaces for ceramics, weaving, metalwork, printing, painting and youth arts. Richmond Art Center also partners with non-profit organizations, community groups and West Contra Costa Unified School District to provide intensive art education programs off-site.

In 2020, COVID-19 shelter-in-place orders temporarily closed Richmond Art Center's facility to the public and the organization launched online arts instruction.

=== Annual events ===
- Student and member exhibitions – since its founding, Richmond Art Center has presented an annual exhibition of work by student and/or member artists.
- Holiday Arts Festival – some kind of 'Christmas Sale' has been a tradition at Richmond Art Center since 1938. The event has been known as the 'Holidays Arts Festival' since 1963.
- WCCUSD Student Show – established in 1966 and organized in partnership with West Contra Costa Unified School District, this annual teacher-curated exhibition presents work by students from middle and high schools in the district.
- The Art of the African Diaspora – founded in 1997 by artists Jan Hart-Schuyers (died 1998) and Rae Louise Hayward (1950–2008), hosted by the Richmond Art Center for 23 years, the Art of Living Black was a non-juried exhibition and open studios for artists of African descent. The 23rd Art of Living Black presented an exhibition of over 100 works at the Richmond Art Center, as well as Open Studios and Satellite Exhibitions at locations across the Bay Area as well as Open Studios and Satellite Exhibitions at locations across the Bay Area. In 2019, the Steering Committee of artists that had been producing the event announced its new name: Art of the African Diaspora. The first exhibition under the new name was in 2020.

== Exhibitions ==
Below is a list of notable exhibitions at Richmond Art Center.

Year	Title	Artist(s)	Curator	Notes/Citations
1955		Emiko Nakano, Clayton Pinkerton		a two person show.
1962	Retrospective Exhibition	Jasper Johns		solo exhibition.
1963		Theodore Odza		solo exhibition
1965		C. Carl Jennings		solo exhibition
1968	Richard Diebenkorn Drawings	Richard Diebenkorn		solo exhibition.
1969	Invisible Painting and Sculpture	Larry Bell, Jerry Ballaine, Bruce Conner, Albert Fisher, Lloyd Hamrol, Wally Hedrick, Warner Jepson, Harry Lum, George Neubert, Harold Paris, Michelangelo Pistoletto, David R. Smith, William T. Wiley	Tom Marioni	
1969	PARTICIPATIONKINETICS!	Paul Kos	Tom Marioni	Kos blocked the entrance with an 1100 pound block of ice and called it "Richmond Glacier". He sprinkled the ice with salt to encourage irregular melting. Kos created other kinetic sculptures.
1971	California Girls	Rita Yokoi, Karen Kimura, Ann Shapiro, Judy Chicago, Judy Raffael, Janet Webb, Andrea Brown, Pat Tavenner, Kathy Goodell, Nancy Haigh, Gae Landrum, Marsha Fox, Cheryl Zurilgen, Judy Linhares, Gi Gi Van der Noot, Terri Keyser	Tom Marioni	Judy Chicago was teaching a course at Fresno State University and had an exhibition and collaboration with her students. They held a fake beauty pageant and each woman represented a city with her sash and performed. According to Marioni, he was fired from his job as curator after this event because of one of the performances was controversial.
1987		Sargent Johnson		commemorating the 100th year of Sargent Johnson's birth.
1996	Showing Up: Maximum-Contrast African-American Quilts	Elzorah Abram, Mable Battle, Irene Bankhead, Laverne Brackens, Mattie Burnley, Charles Cater, Anna Ruth Crofit, Marye Danner, Louisa Fite, Willia Ette Graham, Georgia Green, Aunt Jewel Harts, Kitty Jones, Madeline Mason, Minnie Lee Metcalf, Fannie Mae Moore, Bessie Moore, Anny Bell Simon, Maple Swift, Lucy Sims, Ora L. Thompson, Rosie Lee Tompkins, Gussie Wells, Arbie Williams	Eli Leon	
2010	Roses & Thorns: The Legacy of Richmond's Historic Japanese Nurseries	Artists contributing images of the building and surviving flowers included Matthew Matsuoka, Ellen Gailing, Fletcher Oakes and Ken Osborn	Donna Graves	Exhibition explored the former Japanese-American-owned greenhouses next to the Cutting Boulevard exit of Interstate 80. The show, which celebrated the 75th anniversary of the center, featured 55 contemporary photographs shot at location and offered a glimpse at the rich history of the Japanese-Americans of Richmond.
2012	Wanxin Zhang, A Ten Year Survey, 1999–2009	Wanxin Zhang	John Held Jr. and Peter Held	Exhibition featured 16 of Zhang's "six-foot plus clay figures in an austere setting, transforming the gallery space into a living tomb of warriors posed in battle, not for the vanity of political leaders, but for the enrichment of world citizens."
2014	Closely Considered: Diebenkorn in Berkeley	Richard Diebenkorn		Exhibition featured paintings of Diebenkorn and drawings by Bay Area friends including David Park, Elmer Bischoff, Frank Lobdell, Nathan Oliveria, James Weeks and Joan Brown.
2015		Mildred Howard		solo exhibition.
2016	80th Anniversary Exhibitions: David Park: Personal Perspectives and The Human Spirits	David Park solo, and Elmer Bischoff, Joan Brown, Enrique Chagoya, Kota Ezawa, Viola Frey, Richard Misrach, Lava Thomas, among others.	Jan Wurm	The Center celebrated its 80th anniversary in 2016 with two companion exhibitions, "David Park: Personal Perspectives", featuring 35 works by Park in his final decades from the 1930s through the 1960s, and "The Human Spirits", in which works by many artists influenced by the center were displayed.
2018	Califas: Art of the US-Mexico Borderlands	AGENCY (Ersela Kripa and Stephen Mueller), Chester Arnold, Jesus Barraza, Enrique Chagoya, CRO studio (Adriana Cuellar and Marcel Sánchez), Ana Teresa Fernández, Nathan Friedman, Guillermo Galindo, Rebeca García–González, Andrea Carrillo Iglesias, Amalia Mesa–Bains, Richard Misrach, Alejandro Luperca Morales, Julio César Morales, Postcommodity, Rael San Fratello (Ronald Rael and Virginia San Fratello), Fernando Reyes, Favianna Rodriguez, Stephanie Syjuco, David Taylor, Judi Werthein, Rio Yañez.	Michael Dear, Ronald Rael	Califas: Art of the US-Mexico Borderlands explores representations of the US-Mexico 'borderlands' in contemporary art, with a special emphasis on the Bay Area.
2019	Here is the Sea	Stephen Bruce, Christy Chan, Tanja Geis, Marie-Luise Klotz, Richard Lang and Judith Selby Lang, Love the Bulb Performers, Katie Revilla, Joseph "Jos" Sances, Dimitra Skandali		One of the noted pieces of this exhibit was "Or, The Whale" by Jos Sances. Phil Linhares, former RAC Board member and former chief curator at the Oakland Museum of California adjudged the piece "a real tour de force, an impressive work by any measure, worth a trip to Richmond!"
2020	Art of the African Diaspora	Orin Carpenter, Kelvin Curry, Gene Dominique, Anna Edwards, Raymond L. Haywood, Dulama LeGrande, Justice Renaissance, WilParish, Ron Moultrie Saunders, Akili Simba, Michelle Tompkins, amongst others.		Co-founded by the late Jan Hart-Schuyers and the late Rae Louise Hayward, The Art of Living Black/Art of the African Diaspora is the longest running event of its kind in the Bay Area to feature artists of African descent. In 2020 works by over 150 artists of African descent were featured.
2020	Over and Under	Pilar Agüero-Esparza, Ric Ambrose, Tamera Avery, Megan Broughton, Tyrell Collins, Roya Ebtehaj, Sheila Ghidini, Annette Goodfriend, Xandra Ibarra, Lisa Jetonne, Henrik Kam, Maureen Langenbach, Ifra Mahmood, Katie McCann, Sarah Player Morrison, Susan Zimmerman	Kevin B. Chen	"This exhibition is informed by the interchange of ideas and material, the crisscrossing of bodies and objects, and the weaving of histories and personal narratives. Over 200 artists submitted artwork for consideration; 16 were ultimately selected whose work resonated with these ideas."
