= Wanxin Zhang =

Artist, born Changchun, China

- Born: 1961; Changchun
- Occupation: Sculptor
- Website: www.wanxinzhang.com

Wanxin Zhang (born 1961) is a Chinese-American sculptor based in San Francisco, known for his large-scale ceramic figures, formless ceramic structures, and bronze pieces. He is recognized as one of the leading artists in the new generation of the Bay Area clay movement. Zhang's work is characterized by a fusion of California Funk influence and references to Chinese history. His monumental clay figures convey themes of globalization, politics, and power by reshaping traditional symbols with contemporary pop culture elements. Zhang's work is in the Smithsonian American Art Museum Collections.

== Early life and education ==
Wanxin Zhang was born in Changchun, China, in 1961. He grew up during Mao Zedong's regime in the 1960s and, at the age of 16, began his art education at Jilin Art School (now Jilin University of Art). He later attended Lu Xun Academy of Fine Art in 1980, becoming part of the first generation to receive formal art education after the Cultural Revolution. In 1992, Zhang moved to California and obtained a Master's degree from the Academy of Art University in San Francisco. During his academic years, he worked at the Artworks Foundry in Berkeley, where he encountered and was influenced by artists like Peter Voulkos, Stephen de Staebler, and Manuel Neri.

== Career ==
Zhang's career in the art world began to take shape when he was represented by Triangle Gallery in San Francisco in 1995. This marked the beginning of a series of exhibitions and shows, including a solo show in 2002; his debut museum exhibition, "Pit #5," at The University of Wyoming Art Museum in 2006, curated by Susan Moldenhauer; his first display at Art Beatus Gallery in Hong Kong in 2008; and a ten-year survey traveling show from 2010 to 2012, curated by Peter Held, starting with the Bellevue Arts Museum holding the first in-depth survey of Zhang's work with the exhibit titled "Wanxin Zhang: A Ten Year Survey."

In 2014, Zhang participated in a panel discussion called "RISE UP! Art As Action" with artists Chester Arnold and Michele Pred, and was featured in the San Francisco Arts Education Project's exhibition of the same name. His works have been showcased in various international competitions and biennales, including The 22nd UBE Sculpture Competition in Japan (2007), Taiwan Ceramics Biennale (2008), and the Anren Biennale in China (2017). He received awards such as the Joan Mitchell Painter and Sculptor Grant (2004), the Virginia A. Groot Foundation First Place (2006), and a curatorial award from the Contemporary Jewish Museum in San Francisco (2017). In 2012, Zhang enjoyed an artist-in-residence supported by the Andy Warhol Foundation at the Holter Art Museum.

In recent years, Zhang's work has gained further recognition with exhibitions like "Wanxin Zhang: Totem" at the Catharine Clark Gallery in 2014, "40x40" at the Sonoma State University Art Gallery in 2018, and "Wanxin Zhang: Fahrenheit" at Catharine Clark Gallery in 2018. His 2019 exhibition, "Wanxin Zhang: The Long Journey," was held at the Museum of Craft and Design in San Francisco. In 2020, he participated in "The Body, the Object, the Other" as part of the second clay biennial of Craft Contemporary in Los Angeles. Zhang also had a joint exhibit with ceramicist Richard Shaw at Santa Clara University and the Sonoma Valley Museum of Art titled, "Richard Shaw and Wanxin Zhang", curated by Mark Johnson and Linda Keaton.

In 2021, Zhang's piece "Warrior with Color Face" became part of the Smithsonian American Art Museum's collection for the exhibit "This Present Moment: Crafting a Better World," in honor of the 50th anniversary of the Renwick Gallery. In 2022, Zhang's artwork was on display at the Palm Spring Art Fair and his solo exhibit "Wanxin Zhang: Witness" was showcased at the Catharine Clark Gallery.

This year, Zhang's ceramic sculpture "Color Face" was featured in an outdoor group sculpture exhibition called "Claiming Space: Refiguring the Body in Landscape" at Montalvo Art Center, alongside other notable artists such as Alison Saar, Pilar Agüero-Esparza, and Hank Willis Thomas.

In January 2024, Zhang's works will be presented by the Catharine Clark Gallery at FOG Design+Art in San Francisco, alongside works by Masami Teracka.

=== Teaching ===
He taught at UC Berkeley's Department of Art Practice from 2010 to 2012 and at the San Francisco Art Institute from 2015 to 2020.

== Public Collections ==
Wanxin Zhang's works have been collected by various public institutions, including:

- Asian Art Museum
- American Museum of Ceramic Art
- Arizona State University Art Museum
- Berkeley Art Museum / Pacific Film Archive
- Cantor Art Center at Stanford University
- Crocker Art Museum
- de Young Fine Art Museum San Francisco
- Renwick Gallery of the Smithsonian American Art Museum
- New Mexico State Art Commission
- Lowe Art Museum
- Holter Museum of Art
- Montalvo Art Center
- University of Wyoming Art Museum
- Annie Wong Art Foundation in Hong Kong
- National Art Museum of China in Beijing
- Tokiwa Museum in Japan
