= Arizona State University Art Museum =

Art museum in Tempe, Arizona

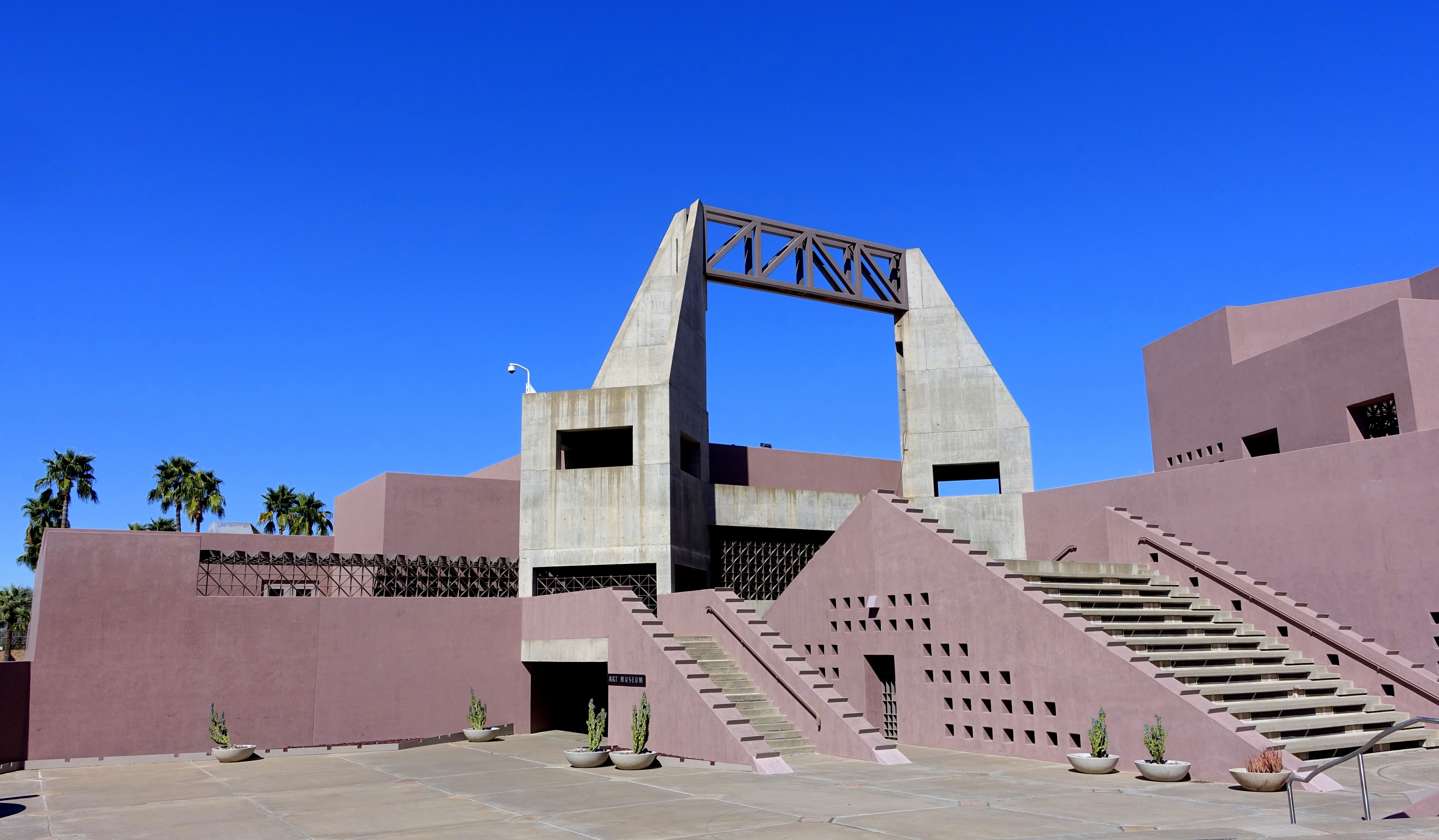
- Established: 1950
- Location: Tempe, Arizona
- Coordinates: 33.4186°N 111.9381°W
- Director: Miki Garcia
- Website: asuartmuseum.asu.edu

The Arizona State University Art Museum is an art museum operated by Arizona State University, located on its main campus in Tempe, Arizona. The Art Museum has some 12,000 objects in its permanent collection and describes its primary focuses as contemporary art, including new media and "innovative methods of presentation"; crafts, with an emphasis on American ceramics; historic and contemporary prints; art from Arizona and the Southwestern United States, with an emphasis on Latino artists, and art of the Americas, with one historic American pieces and modernist and contemporary Latin American works.

The art collection was established in 1950. The current director of the Art Museum is Miki Garcia. The director of the museum reports to the dean of the ASU Herberger Institute for Design and the Arts, and community members are represented through the museum's Creative Impact Board. The museum is located in two buildings. The main exhibition space is the Nelson Fine Arts Center, designed by architect Antoine Predock. A second museum facility, the Ceramics Research Center lies to the north, on 7th Street and Mill Ave in the Brickyard Engineering Building. Admission to the museum is free. Parking at the main museum is free if you use the reserved spaces directly in front of the museum. Parking at the Brickyard location is metered.

== History and facilities ==
In 1950, prominent Phoenix lawyer Oliver B. James gave a gift of 16 oil paintings by American artists to ASU. Over five years, James donated over 149 works by various American, Mexican, and European artists to the museum. The collection was originally included among the stacks at the university's first library building, the Matthews Library. The Neoclassical building was constructed in 1930 and was remodelled in 1951. The library was expanded in 1955, but in 1966, with the library space outgrowing the university's collection, Matthews Library was closed and 16 miles (26 km) of books were moved to the Charles Trumbull Hayden Library, which had been completed the previous year and remains the university's main library today.

The art collection remained at the Matthews Library building, renamed Matthews Center. Contributions from donors expanded the museum's collections, particularly of prints and American crafts. Rudy Turk was the founding director and curator of the Arizona State University Art Museum, where he worked from 1967 until 1992.

In 1977, the museum received a National Endowment for the Arts matching grant to purchase of contemporary American ceramics. By 1978, the museum occupied the entire second floor of the Matthews Center, with some 10,000 square feet (930 m^{2}) of exhibition space. In April 1989, the ASU Art Museum moved into the newly completed Nelson Fine Arts Center, designed by architect Antoine Predock, where the museum remains today. The Nelson Center is 49,700 square feet (4,620 m^{2}) and includes five galleries as well as administrative offices and storage and processing areas. Soon after the Art Museum's move to its new facility, the size of its staff doubled, and a curator of education, a print collection manager and several administrative and security workers were added to the staff.

In 1992, Marilyn A. Zeitlin became the museum's director. Zeitlin was praised for expanding the museum's collections eightfold during her tenure. Under Zeitlin, the museum was chosen to curate video artist Bill Viola's show at the United States Pavilion at the Venice Biennale in 1995. However, the museum experienced controversy when The Arizona Republic revealed that a university audit in early 2007 showed that the museum had received $450,000 over seven years from prominent donor Stephane Janssen, one of the museum's largest donors, and arranged with him to buy art from Janssen's company. The arrangement was found to not be illegal but was discontinued. Zeitlin stepped down at the end of the year in 2007 after 15 years as director. There was "unanimous agreement that the ASU Art Museum has flourished" during Zeitlin's tenure.

In March 2002, the Ceramics Research Center opened in the Tempe Center just to the north of the Nelson Center. The center was designed by Gabor Lorant Architects, Inc. and includes 7,500 square feet (700 m^{2}) with two galleries, open storage stacks and a research library. Additional facilities at the library's two buildings include a lecture room, a print study room, and a "nymphaeum" (courtyard).

== Collections ==
Works of contemporary art held by the museum include works by Hung Liu, Karel Appel, Derek Boshier, Deborah Butterfield, Sue Coe, Dan Collins, Vernon Fisher, Jon Haddock, William Kentridge, Lynn M. Randolph, Frances Whitehead, and William T. Wiley.

The focus of ASU Art Museum's Latin American art holdings is on Mexican art from the 20th century, Mexican ceramics and folk art; and contemporary Cuban art. The core of the Latin American collection was donated to the museum in 1950 and includes works by David Alfaro Siqueiros, Diego Rivera, and Rufino Tamayo. Later acquisitions of pieces by Mexican artists include works by Carlos Mérida, Leonel Góngora, Rafael and Pedro Coronel; José Guadalupe Posada, Leopoldo Mendez, and other members of the Taller de Gráfica Popular; and the contemporary artists Alejandro Colunga, Lucio Muniain, and Nestor Quiñones. Works by Cuban artists in the museum collection include works by Yamilys Brito, Pedro Alvarez, Tonel (Antonio Eligio Fernández), Osvaldo Yero, Abel Barroso, René Francisco, Jacqueline Brito, Fernando Rodríguez, José A. Toirac, and Kcho. The museum has also acquired pieces by Brazilian artists Tiago Carneiro da Cunha, Efrain Almeida, and Oscar Oiwa.

American works comprises one of the ASU Art Museum's smallest collections. ASU's holdings of American art began with the museum's original contributions from Oliver B. James. Earlier works in the collection include early American limner painters, while the most recent works are from 20th century modernists, including Charles Demuth, Yasuo Kuniyoshi and Stuart Davis. Among the holdings in the American collection are various 19th-century Romantic landscape paintings from the 19th century, Ash Can School works, and portraits, include Gilbert Stuart's Mrs Stephen Peabody (1809). The museum holds Georgia O'Keeffe's Horse's Skull on Blue (1930), a depiction of a sun-bleached skull that is the first in a series of skull paintings created by O'Keeffe after bones found in the desert around her ranch. The painting's blue background are a reference to the skies of New Mexico and the painting is in the memento mori tradition of still lifes. The museum also holds Edward Hopper's House by a Road (1942); and Albert Pinkham Ryder's The Canal (1915).

The print collections at the ASU Art Museum include some 5,000 prints held in the Jules Heller Print Study Room. A focus of the museum's print collection is dealing with social and political issues; works include pieces by William Hogarth, Honoré Daumier, Francisco Goya, José Guadalupe Posada, Leopoldo Mendéz, and Francesc Torres. The collection includes some 50 prints and paper works by contemporary Cuban artists and 123 lithographs and intaglios by Sue Coe. The print collection also includes examples of Japanese ukiyo-e.

The museum's ceramics collection includes some 3,500 pieces, of which half are displayed at any one time at the Ceramics Research Center. Works include pieces by Peter Vandenberge, Marilyn Levine, Richard Shaw, Lanier Meaders, Clayton Bailey, Tanya Batura, Tip Toland, Henry Varnum Poor, Viola Frey, Robert Arneson, Jack Earl, Michael Lucero, Stephen De Staebler, Darrin Hallowell, Robert David Brady, Nora Naranjo-Morse, Beth Cavener Stichter, Peter Voulkos, Robert Turner, Kenneth Ferguson, Don Reitz, David Shaner, Maria Poveka Martinez and Santana, Fannie Nampeyo, Rick Dillingham, Wayne Higby, Eddie Dominguez, Warren MacKenzie, Karen Karnes, Ted Randall, Val Cushing, William Daley, John Mason, Jun Kaneko, Toshiko Takaezu, Richard DeVore, Edwin Scheier, John Gill, Les Lawrence, Chris Staley, Anne Hirondelle, Peter Shire, Michael Corney, Richard T. Notkin, Adrian Saxe, Ralph Bacerra, Michael Gross, Akio Takamori, David Regan, Jason Walker, Jerry Rothman, Beatrice Wood, Betty Woodman, Bernard Leach, Michael Cardew, Lucie Rie, Hans Coper, Kanjiro Kawai, and Shoji Hamada.

== Readying the Museum ==
The ASU Art Museum was the administrative home, and grant administrator of the Readying the Museum initiative. Other partners included the Museum of Contemporary Art Santa Barbara and the Oakland Museum of California.

Funded by the Ford Foundation and the Mellon Foundation, the initiative developed an open-access methodology intended to help museums address issues related to governance, accountability, equity, labor practices, and community engagement. The project originated in 2020 amid calls for institutional reform across the museum sector following the murder of George Floyd, and the subsequent protests for racial justice. It culminated in November 2025.
