= Berkeley Art Center =

Community art center and gallery

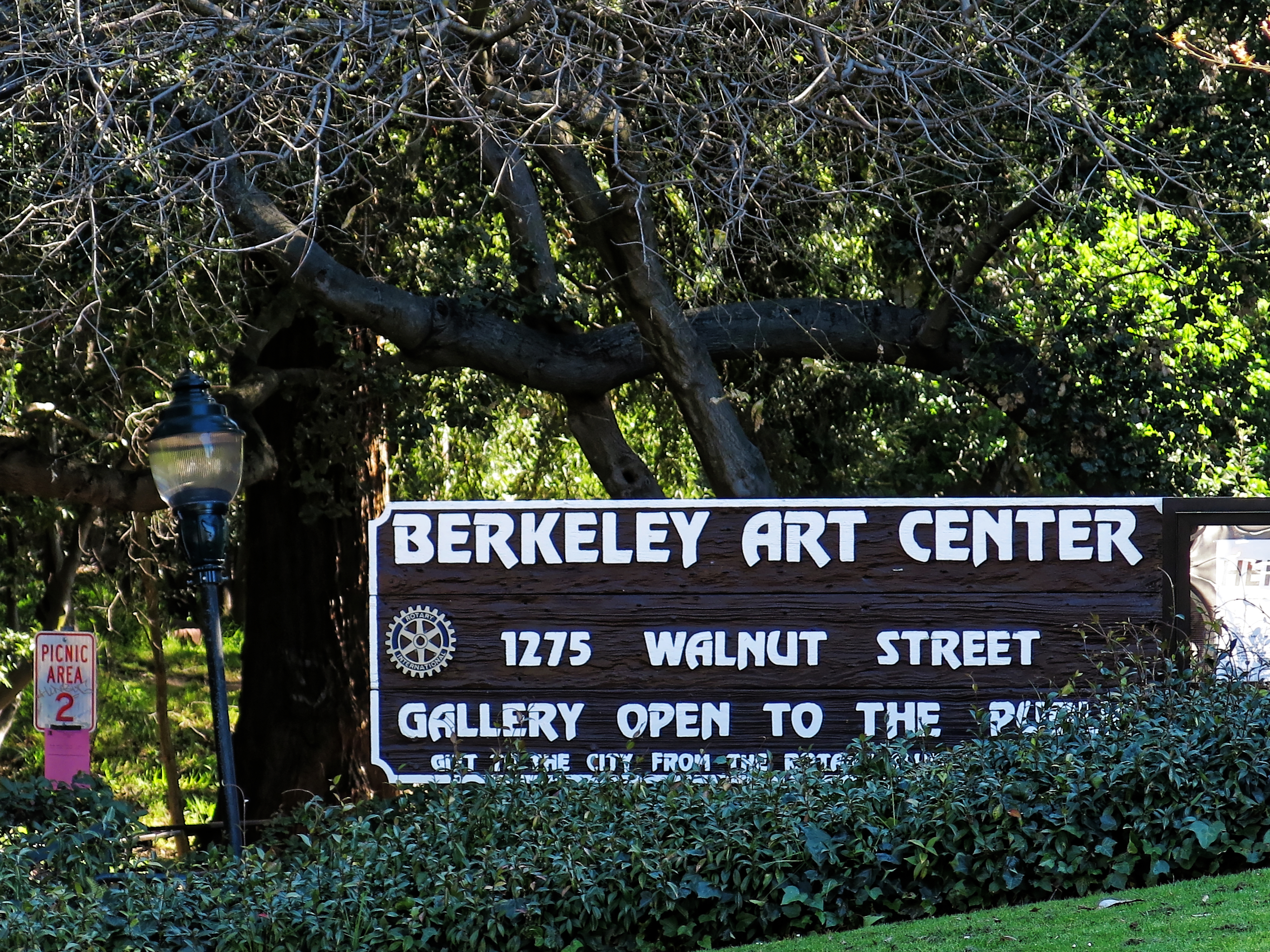
- Abbreviation: BAC
- Formation: May 7, 1967; 59 years ago
- Type: Nonprofit arts organization
- Headquarters: 1275 Walnut Street, Berkeley, California, U.S.
- Coordinates: 37.885242°N 122.268225°W
- Key people: Daniel Nevers (executive director)
- Affiliations: Berkeley Rotary Club
- Website: www.berkeleyartcenter.org
- Formerly called: Berkeley Rotary Art Center

Berkeley Art Center (BAC) is a nonprofit arts organization, community art space, and gallery founded in 1967 and located at 1275 Walnut Street in Live Oak Park, Berkeley, California.

== History ==
The Berkeley Art Center building was built by the Berkeley Rotary Club, and the Arts and Crafts-style building was designed by architect Robert W. Ratcliff. It was formally named the Berkeley Rotary Art Club. The rotary club donated the space to the city, and it was run by the Berkeley Parks and Recreation Department until 1979 when the Berkeley Art Center Association nonprofit was founded.

Many of the exhibits at BAC have referenced issues such as California history, social movements, beauty, identity, equity, and community. The first art exhibition opened on May 7, 1967, with the show 6 Figure Painters, curated by Carl Worth and featured Robert Bechtle, Gerald Gooch, Erle Loran, Richard McClean, Boyd Allen, and Jerrold Ballaine.

Artists that have shown at BAC include Chiura Obata (1967), C. Carl Jennings (1974), David Huffman (2021), Rodney Ewing (2016), Jamil Hellu (2016), Jan Wurm (2018), Bill Fontana (1985), Mildred Howard (1987), Taraneh Hemami (2004), Carlos Villa (1987), Sylvia Lark (1987), Joseph Goldyne (1987), Kay Sekimachi (2008), Patricio Moreno Toro (1995), among others.

Since September 2018, Daniel Nevers is the executive director, he replaced Ann Trinca.

== See also ==
- Kala Art Institute
- List of people from Berkeley, California, includes artists
