= Jan Wurm =

American painter

- Born: 1951 (age 74–75); New York, U.S.
- Education: University of California, Los Angeles; Royal College of Art
- Known for: painting, curation, educator

Jan Wurm (born 1951) is an American painter, educator and curator. Her work comes out of a figurative tradition rooted in social commentary. Wurm draws on a combination of modern German, Austrian, and American aesthetics to depict human interactions and daily life.

== Biography ==
Born in 1951 in New York, Wurm moved at age three to California, then to Innsbruck, Austria at age eight before returning to Los Angeles four years later. It was during this early sojourn in Europe that Wurm first began drawing.

At the University of California, Los Angeles, Wurm achieved a Bachelor of Arts degree in 1972, studying with Richard Diebenkorn and Llyn Foulkes. In 1975 she gained her graduate degree at the Royal College of Art in London where her tutors were Peter Blake and Philip Rawson.

in 1978, her work was shown at the Los Angeles Municipal Art Gallery at Barnsdall Park in the vibrant program headed by director Josine Ianco-Starrels. Infused with the light of the Southland, Jan Wurm's canvases dipped into a luminous palette. Yet, as later noted by critic, Josef Woodard, "Angst hums in the periphery of seemingly casual scenes." Wurm eventually settled in Berkeley, which became the base from which she established an active role in the community, teaching and lecturing for the ASUC Berkeley Art Studio and UC Berkeley Extension. Working with the UC Art Alumni Group Steering Committee Wurm organizes an annual symposium and facilitates a monthly Art Meet Up. She established “Spring Training”, a new program connecting artists with dealers, critics, and curators in one-on-one mentoring sessions. In 2009 she established and facilitated the ongoing Artist Lecture Series for the Berkeley Art Center.

She teaches summer courses in Europe, including the Kuenstlerdorf in Neumarkt an der Raab, Austria in Summer 2014. In 2014, she curated "Closely Considered - Diebenkorn in Berkeley" at the Richmond Art Center.

== Work ==
The monumental, life size paintings of Jan Wurm depict the cycle of life from childhood through old age, reflecting on relationships, unspoken emotions, and specific moments in time. As art historian, Suzaan Boettger, has written, "This 'social realism' exemplifies not the didactic, overly politicized American painting of the 1930s nor the propagandistic version perverted and promoted by authoritarian governments everywhere, but that of Gustave Courbet's 1855 demonstration of a 'realist allegory' -- of that desire to portray representative figures and situations that suggest the actualities of modern life." Wurm's paintings are sometimes painted with single images, and sometimes with "double exposure" style images in which figures occupy more than one position on the canvas. In reference to Wurm's layered painting style, Miller writes "the figments of previous presences hover like ghosts, crowding the scene with an unexplained history." These unexplained figures create a space for viewers to build their own meaning and identify with the image individually. The paintings reveal "the public and private aspects of a relationship", and invite the viewer to become a part of that relationship or interaction.

The scenes commonly present figures in motion, encouraging viewers to sense a "weighty, something's-going-to-happen feeling, or a sight sense of the bizarre or surreal." Wurm’s work was first placed in the context of Bay Area Figurative Painting in an exhibition at the University of California San Diego’s Mandeville Art Gallery, which showcased Joan Brown, Roy De Forest, and Robert Colescott. In 1985, Boettger wrote "Her flattened, expressively outlined forms also merge the expressionistic and realist approaches to figuration, which are both prominently associated with the art of the San Francisco Bay region since World War II." While the California painting scene has strongly influenced Wurm's work, her ties to modernist European painting styles are undeniable. In a 2001 Artweek article, Josef Woodard wrote "Echoes of the Expressionists from the "Neue Sachlichkeit" school, especially Max Beckmann's style, provide a paradigm for Wurm's paintings, both as social statements and in terms of a rough, slashing painting attack that disguises an underscoring beauty."

Jan Wurm's narrative drawing has most recently been presented within a fundamental context of Los Angeles artists Charles Garabedian, Martin Lubner, and Pierre Picot at the Carl Cherry Center for the Arts exhibition, "Off Center." The idiosyncratic work crosses categories and styles to establish new visual vocabulary. In the view of Cherry Center director, Robert Reese, the task of the work is "to paint what it means to be human in a place advertised as paradise." Suzanne Muchnic contextualized the work as indicative of the all-American lifestyle, writing "If you dug these paintings up a thousand years from now, you'd have a fair idea of American middle-class mentality in the mid-20th century." Under the brush of Jan Wurm, even the most costumed and innocuous of male sportsmanship as golf can be distilled into a display of male power and assertion as noted in "Man as Object: Reversing the Gaze. Curator Sinem Banna notes how Wurm's work "flows between painting and drawing just as her visual language bridges abstraction and figuration."

== Collections and archives ==
The artist’s archives are maintained in the United States by the Library of the National Museum of Women in the Arts in Washington DC and in Britain by the National Art Library in the Victoria and Albert Museum in London. Her artwork is in public collections including the Fine Arts Museums of San Francisco in the Achenbach Foundation for Graphic Arts, the New York Public Library Print Collection, the Universität für Angewante Kunst in Vienna, University of California, Tiroler Landesmuseen, Moderne Galerie / Graphische Sammlungen, Innsbruck

The series of watercolors developed for the Ladengalerie exhibition “Das Tier” are now part of the Archive Verein der Berliner Künstlerinnen and documented in "Torso," the third volume of an historical survey of women artists in Berlin.
