= Jerrold Ballaine =

American artist (born 1934)

Jerrold Curtis Ballaine
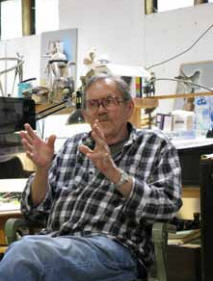
- Artist Jerrold Ballaine in studio
- Born: February 16, 1934 (age 92); Seattle, Washington, U.S.
- Occupations: Painter, sculptor, and educator
- Awards: San Francisco Museum of Drawing and Print Art, Annual Award; Fourth International Young Artists Exhibition Award Tokyo, Japan

Academic background
- Education: University of Washington, Seattle; Art Center School in Los Angeles; California School of Fine Arts San Francisco; San Francisco Art Institute

Academic work
- Institutions: University of California, Berkeley
- Website: https://jerroldballaineart.com/

Jerrold Curtis Ballaine (born February 16, 1934) is an American painter, sculptor, draftsman, photographer and educator, presently Emeritus Professor of Art at the University of California, Berkeley. https://jerroldballaineart.com/resume.htm

Ballaine has done significant work as a sculptor. Most of his work involves creating female figures with lines and flow while adding texture and motion to the figurative sculpturing. Some of his works involves modernized aspects of Greek sculpturing while adding colors to the stone carving. His work has been represented in numerous collections, including Whitney Museum of American Art, Oakland Museum of California, Museum of Art, Rhode Island School of Design, Smithsonian Institution, SFMOMA, Wichita Art Museum, Swiss State Museum, Amon Carter Museum, Denver Art Museum, Joslyn Art Museum, San Jose Museum of Art, Crocker Art Museum, Logan Museum of Art, and several private collections.

During his tenure as an Art Professor, Ballaine was acting director of the University Art Museum. In 1980, he was awarded the Humanities Research Fellowship.

== Education ==
Ballaine attended the University of Washington, Seattle from 1952 to 1955. He subsequently joined Art Center School in Los Angeles in 1958. Later on, he completed his B.F.A. degree from the California School of Fine Arts in San Francisco in 1959, and his M.F.A. degree from the San Francisco Art Institute in 1961.

== Career ==
Ballaine started his teaching career in 1963 at Cornish School of Allied Arts, Seattle. In 1965, he joined the University of California, Berkeley and worked there till 1994. During his teaching career, he received many awards including; Summer Faculty Fellowship in 1969, Creative Arts Institute Grant in 1971, Humanities Research Fellowship in 1980. He also served as Interim Museum Director for a year from 1975 to 1976 during his teaching career in the University of California.

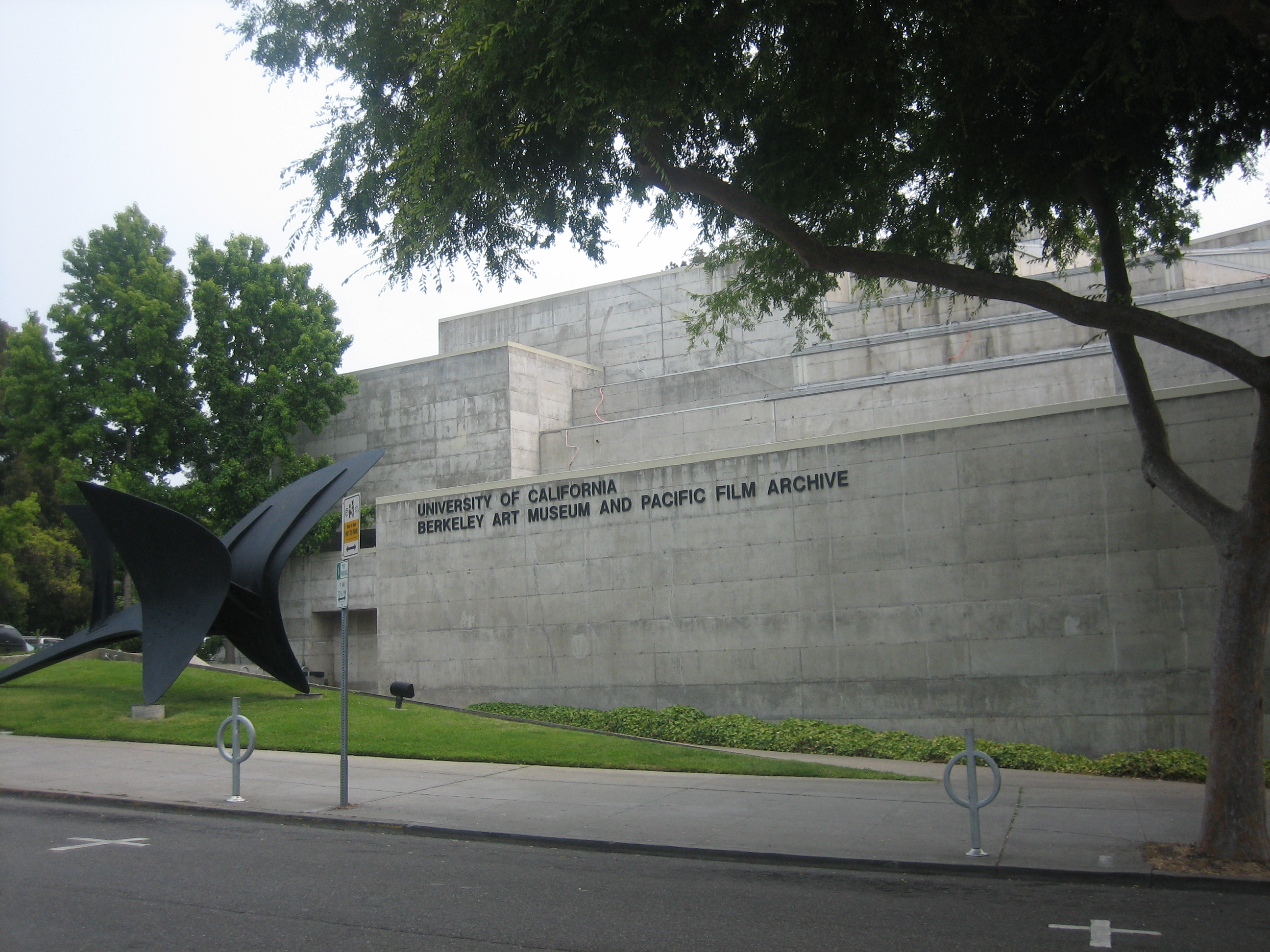
Photo of UC Berkeley Art Museum in 2008

== History of Work ==
In the 1960s, the art world categorized him among the Bay Area figurative painters, a West Coast foil to the East coast, "Abstract Expressionist" movement. His first solo exhibition was in New York at the Zabriskie Gallery in 1960 and at the then important gallery, Gump's San Francisco, in 1961. From that origin, came 50 solo exhibitions and an equal number of group appearances.

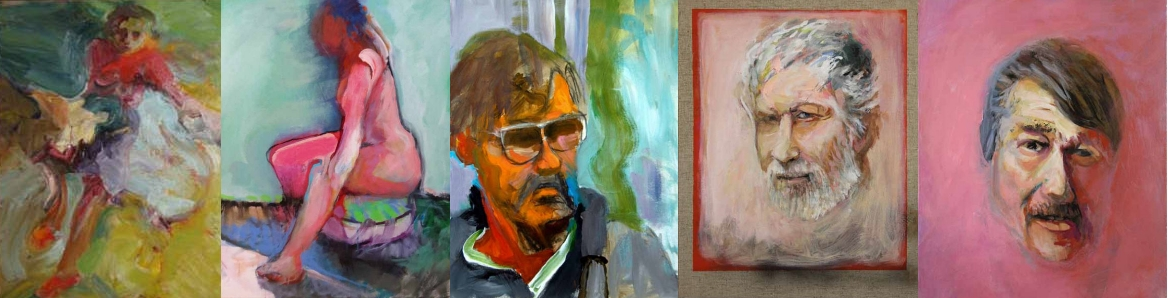
Figurative painting by Jerrold Ballaine: includes self, Neri and Diebenkorn

=== Landscape ===
In response to a stimulus by Peter Selz, Professor of art at UC Berkeley (1965–1988) and director of the Berkeley Art Museum (1965–1973): "Why not landscape? Why can't we do landscape?" Ballaine worked for many years producing vast numbers of paintings themed in landscape, seascape, cloud formations, trees in winter, animals, and a wonderful series on China Town, San Francisco.

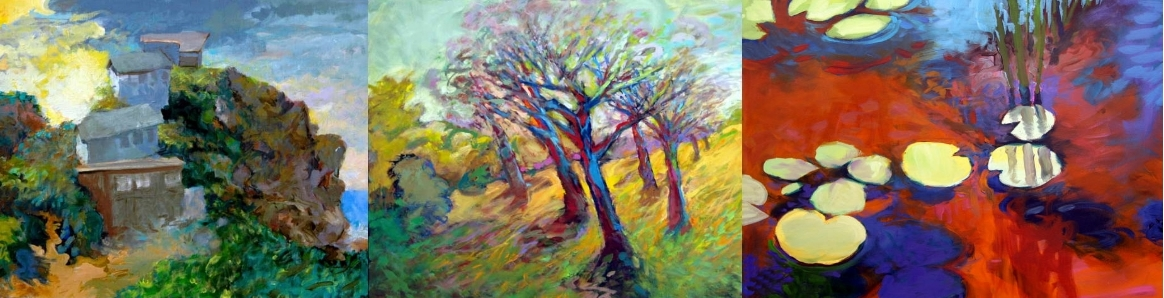
Examples of landscape paintings of Jerrold Ballaine

=== Drawing ===
Steeped in the fundamentals of drawing through his years at the Art Center School in Los Angeles, he was influenced by Lorser Feitelson, John Altoon) and Harry Carmean; drawing was to become his home, usually working directly from models.

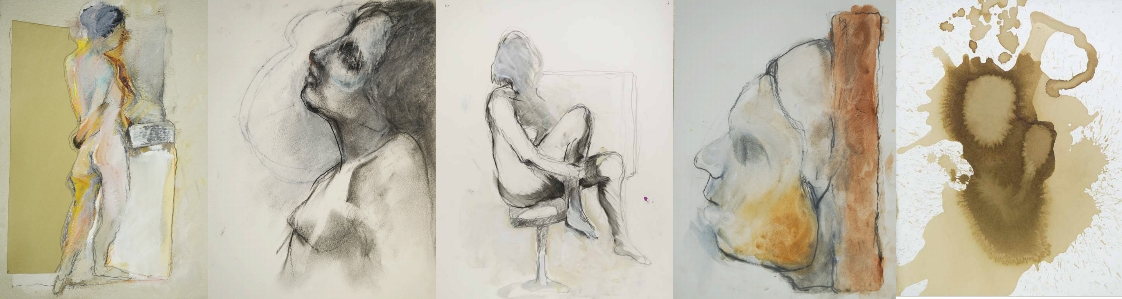
Several examples of drawings of Jerrold Ballaine

=== Sculpture ===
Ballaine shared studio space with Joan Brown, Manuel Neri's wife. Neri suggested aiming his figurative view towards sculpture and invited him to share his studio in Carara, Italy for several summers. His sculptural work combines the purity of Carara marble with Ballaine's unique color palette.

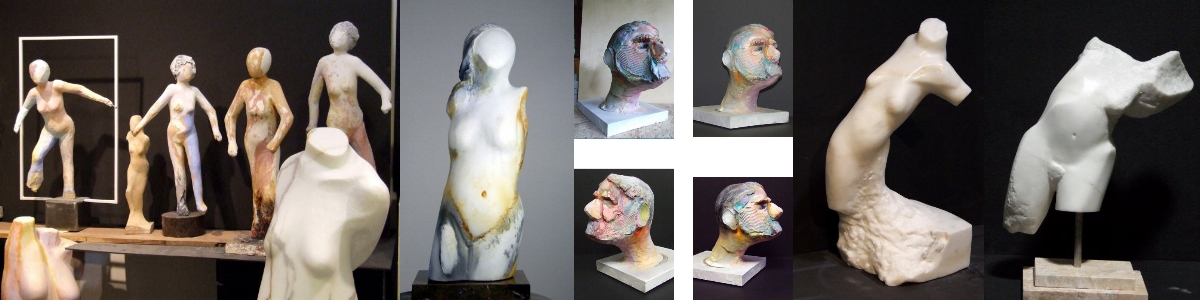
The sculpture of Jerrold Ballaine

=== Funk ===
He was a major contributor to the San Francisco Bay area movement known as "Funk," so designated by Peter Selz.[8] Ballaine employed large specialized ovens and suction machinery to create unique painted three dimensional works. For four decades he worked in this way, his creations a mixture of manipulated and molded thyroplastics. These were the subject of three major books on this unique form of three dimensional painting by Jack Leissring reference. The earliest work was in an exhibition curated by Peter Selz in 1967.

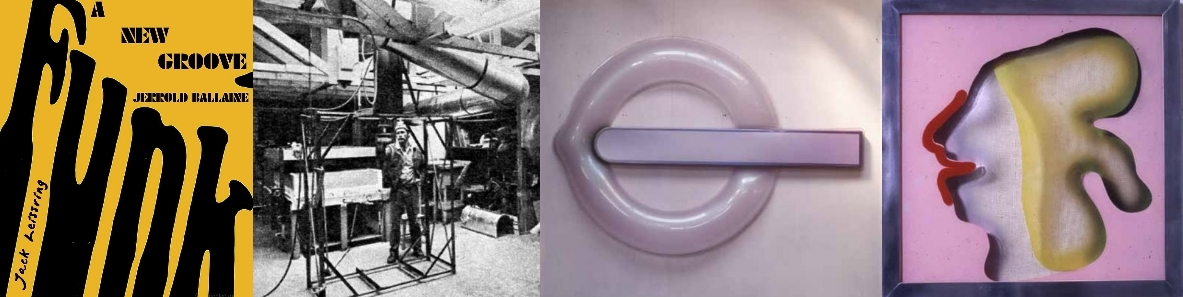
Book cover, vacuum form tool and vacuum formed artwork

=== Photography ===
In the 1970s, Ballaine used a different medium, photography, to achieve his artistic goals which were critically praised by the San Francisco Chronicle art critic, Thomas Albright (https://www.upi.com/Archives/1984/05/15/Obituary/6481453441600/. (Art in the San Francisco Bay Area, 1945–1980: An Illustrated History, 1985, 978-0520055186)

== Awards and honors ==
- 1960 – San Francisco Museum of Drawing and Print Art, Annual Award

== Bibliography ==
=== Exhibitions ===
- 1967 - University Art Museum, Univ. California Berkeley, April/May 1967
- 1995 – Kuwait Museum. Al-Adwane Gallery, Guest of Kuwait Govt.
- 1995 – Traveled Egypt
- 1998 – Trosa, Sweden
- 1998 – Gallery "C" International, Paris, France
- 1999 – Athens Gallery, Athens, Greece
- 2004 – Quicksilver Mine Co. Forestville, CA.
- 2006 – 1212 Gallery, Burlingame, CA.
- 2008 – Withywindle Gallery, Guerneville, Calif
- 2010, 2011, 2012, 2013 – JC Leissring Fine Art, Santa Rosa, Ca. and Permanent Collection
- 2014 – Christie Marks Gallery, Healdsburg, Ca., May 9 – June 22, 2014
