= Eli Leon =

American psychologist and quilt collector

Eli Leon (1935–2018) born as Robert Stanley Leon, was an American psychologist, writer and collector. As a self-taught scholar of African-American quilts, he helped bring attention to the field and especially to the quilts of Rosie Lee Tompkins.

== Early life and education ==
Leon was born in the Bronx on June 27, 1935, the son of first-generation Jews from Lithuania. He attended the High School of Music & Art and spent his summers at Black Mountain College, where he studied with potter Karen Karnes.

He entered Oberlin College before transferring to Reed College in Portland, Oregon. He earned a Bachelor of Arts degree from Reed College in Psychology in 1958. He earned a master's degree from the University of Chicago, where he trained in Reichian psychotherapy. In the late 1950s and early '60s, he was briefly married to his college girlfriend, although they both knew he was gay. Sometime after that he changed his first name to Eli and settled in Oakland, California.

== Collection ==
An obsessive collector, Leon became a regular at flea markets in and around Oakland, where his main focus became African-American quilts. He became an expert on the subject, traveling to Texas, Louisiana and Arkansas to conduct research. In 1989, he received a Guggenheim Fellowship to continue his research.

Leon organized a number of exhibitions across the United States, for which he wrote the catalogs:

- Who'd a Thought It: Improvisation in African-American Quiltmaking (San Francisco Craft & Folk Art Museum, c. 1987)
- Models in the Mind: African Prototypes in American Patchwork (Winston-Salem, N.C.: Diggs Gallery: Winston-Salem State University, c. 1992)
- Arbie Williams Transforms the Britches Quilt (Regents of the University of California and the Mary Porter Sesnon Gallery, UCSC, 1993)
- "Showing up": Maximum-Contrast African-American Quilts (Richmond, CA: Richmond Art Center, 1996)
- Something Else to See: Improvisational Bordering Styles in African-American Quilts (University of Massachusetts at Amherst, c. 1997)
- No Two Alike : African-American Improvisations on a Traditional Patchwork Pattern (Columbia, S.C.: South Carolina State Museum, c. 1998)
- Something Pertaining to God (Shelburne, VT: Shelburne Museum, 2006)
- Accidentally on Purpose: The Aesthetic Management of Irregularities in African Textiles and African-American Quilts (Davenport, Iowa: Figge Art Museum, 2007)

== Death and legacy ==
Upon his death on March 6, 2018, in Emeryville, California, Leon bequeathed his collection of almost 3000 African-American quilts, including more than 500 by Rosie Lee Tompkins, to the Berkeley Art Museum and Pacific Film Archive (BAMPFA), whose director, Lawrence Rinder, worked closely with Leon to organize the first solo exhibition of Tompkin's work in 1997. The bequest will account for about 15 percent of the museum's art collection.

Drawing from the Eli Leon Collection, BAMPFA organized the exhibit Rosie Lee Tompkins: A Retrospective (February 19 to July 19, 2020). Drawing on the larger collection, BAMPFA organized the exhibition Routed West: Twentieth Century African American Quilts in California (June 8, 2025—November 30, 2025) and published a book with the same title. On the eve of the show's opening, approximately $230,000 in conservation funds from an Institute of Museum and Library Services "Save America’s Treasures" grant was revoked by an executive order from Donald Trump, placing the museum and the Eli Leon Collection squarely in the crosshairs of the Trump Administration's "war on woke."

== See also ==
- Rosie Lee Tompkins
- Laverne Brackens
- Berkeley Art Museum and Pacific Film Archive (BAMPFA)
