= Rudy Turk =

American museum director, painter (1927–2007)

Rudy Henry Turk
- Born: June 24, 1927; Sheboygan, Wisconsin, U.S.
- Died: August 14, 2007 (aged 80); Phoenix, Arizona, U.S.
- Education: University of Wisconsin–Sheboygan, University of Tennessee, Indiana University
- Occupations: Visual artist, art historian, curator, museum director
- Known for: Arts administration, painting
- Spouse: Wanda Lee Borders
- Children: 4

Rudy Henry Turk (1927—2007), was an American visual artist, art historian, curator, and museum director. He served as the director emeritus and former curator of the Arizona State University Art Museum in Tempe, Arizona. Turk was elected as an honorary fellow by the American Craft Council (ACC) in 1988.

== Biography ==
Rudy Henry Turk was born on June 24, 1927, in Sheboygan, Wisconsin, U.S. He attended the University of Wisconsin–Sheboygan (now University of Wisconsin–Green Bay; B.S. 1949, education); the University of Tennessee (M.A. 1951, history); and did postgraduate work at Indiana University in 1956.

Turk held a position from 1960 to 1965 as director of the Richmond Arts Center in Richmond, California, before serving as director of the fine arts gallery in San Diego (now the San Diego Museum of Art). He was the founding director and curator of the Arizona State University Art Museum (formerly the Matthews Center) in Tempe, Arizona, starting in 1967 and he retired in 1992.

Turk's own artwork was in the mediums of painting, pottery, printmaking, and sculpture. He took his first art class in the 1950s, and he found inspiration in early Christian art and catacomb paintings.

He died on August 14, 2007, in Phoenix, Arizona. He was survived by his wife Wanda Lee Turk (née Borders) and their four children.
