= Live Oak Park (Berkeley) =

Park in Berkeley, California, United States

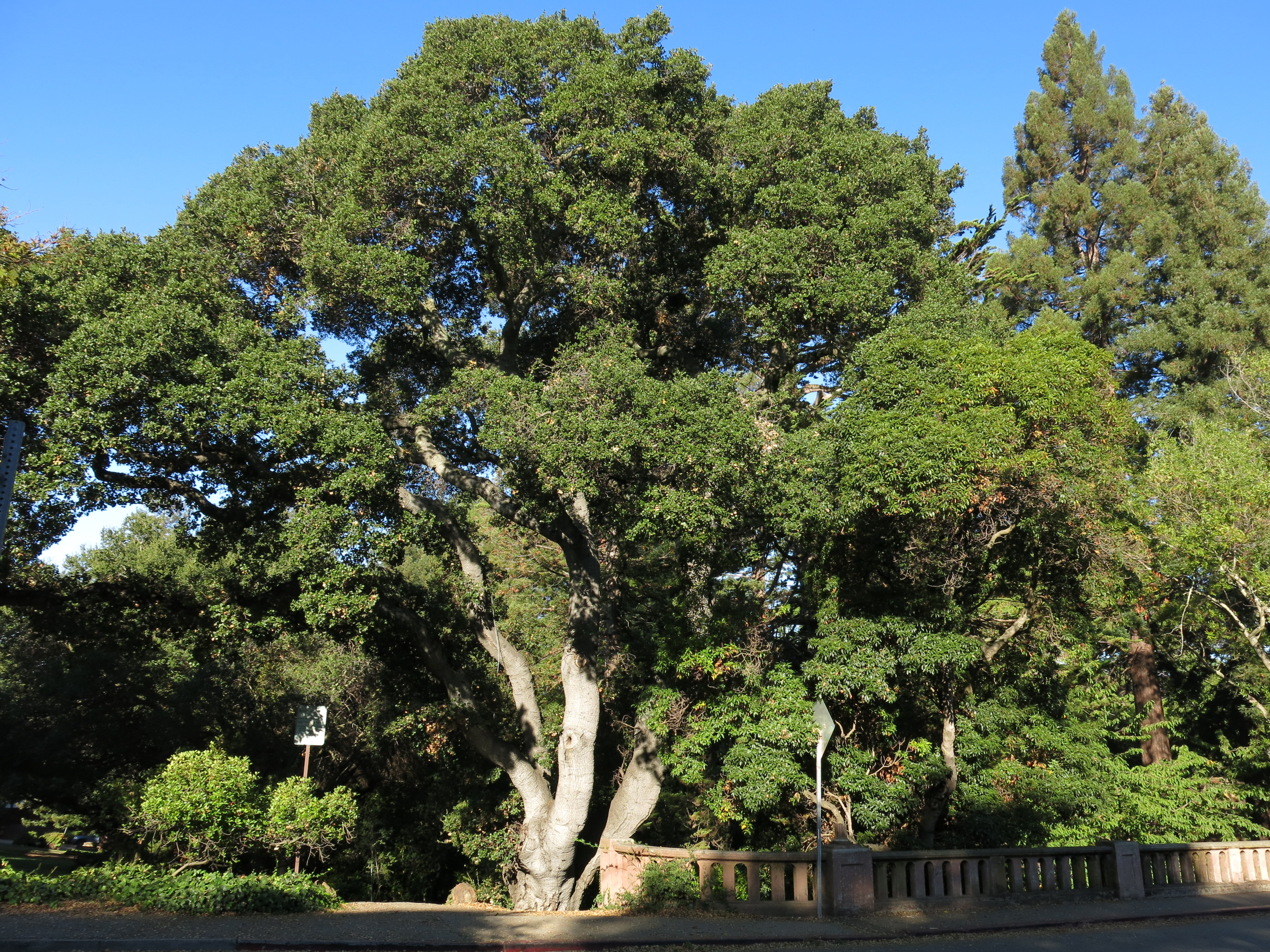
- Coast Live Oak on Walnut Street
- Interactive map of Live Oak Park (Berkeley)
- Type: City park
- Location: Berkeley, California, United States
- Coordinates: 37.8840195°N 122.2692083°W
- Created: 1914
- Operator: City of Berkeley
- Website: Live Oak Park

Live Oak Park is a public park and recreation area of the city of Berkeley, California, it lies in the center of several North Berkeley neighborhoods, 5.5 acres of nature juxtaposed with facilities that form the beating heart of the area. It's a place where play areas, basketball and tennis courts, an indoor theater and the Berkeley Art Center share space with native oaks and California Bay Laurels, quiet shady picnic areas, a spacious grassy knoll and the lovely Codornices Creek, which flows through the park. Live Oak Park is one of Berkeley's oldest and most naturalistic public parks.

== Geography ==
Live Oak Park sits along both sides of Codornices Creek like a narrow green belt in 1301 Shattuck Avenue, at Berryman Street between Shattuck Avenue and Oxford Street. Walnut Street runs through the middle of the park as Codornices Creek meanders through its grove of native oaks, accented here and there with big, old specimen trees originally planted in the original gardens that preceded the park.
Live Oak Park is situated here because of the many little creeks that flow from the Berkeley Hills the short way down to San Francisco Bay. These little creeks are more powerful than they look. As rising sea level filled the current Bay at the end of the last Ice Age, the creeks basically built what are now the flatlands, by carrying rock and soil eroded from the earthquake-riven, still-rising hills.
Codornices Creek is one of these original creeks which run out of the Berkeley Hills in the San Francisco Bay Area in California. In its upper stretch, it passes entirely within the city limits of Berkeley and further downstream, it marks the city limit to the adjacent city of Albany in its lower section. The name of the creek derives from the Spanish word "codornices", meaning "quails". California valley quail were once common in the area. The name was given by one of the family Peralta, once owners of the vast Rancho San Antonio.

== History ==
=== Origin ===
In the early days of Berkeley, the vast area that now includes the Live Oak Park and its neighborhoods and which extended over the top of the Berkeley Hills, was acquired in 1860 by one of Berkeley's earliest settlers, Napoleon Bonaparte Byrne. He and his family and Pete and Hannah Byrne, two former slaves who had been freed prior to the journey west, made the long trek across the continent from Missouri to settle on the banks of Codornices Creek and to begin farming their 800 acres. Because the Byrnes had invested in a farming venture in the Delta, they began selling their Berkeley property piece by piece, beginning in 1873.

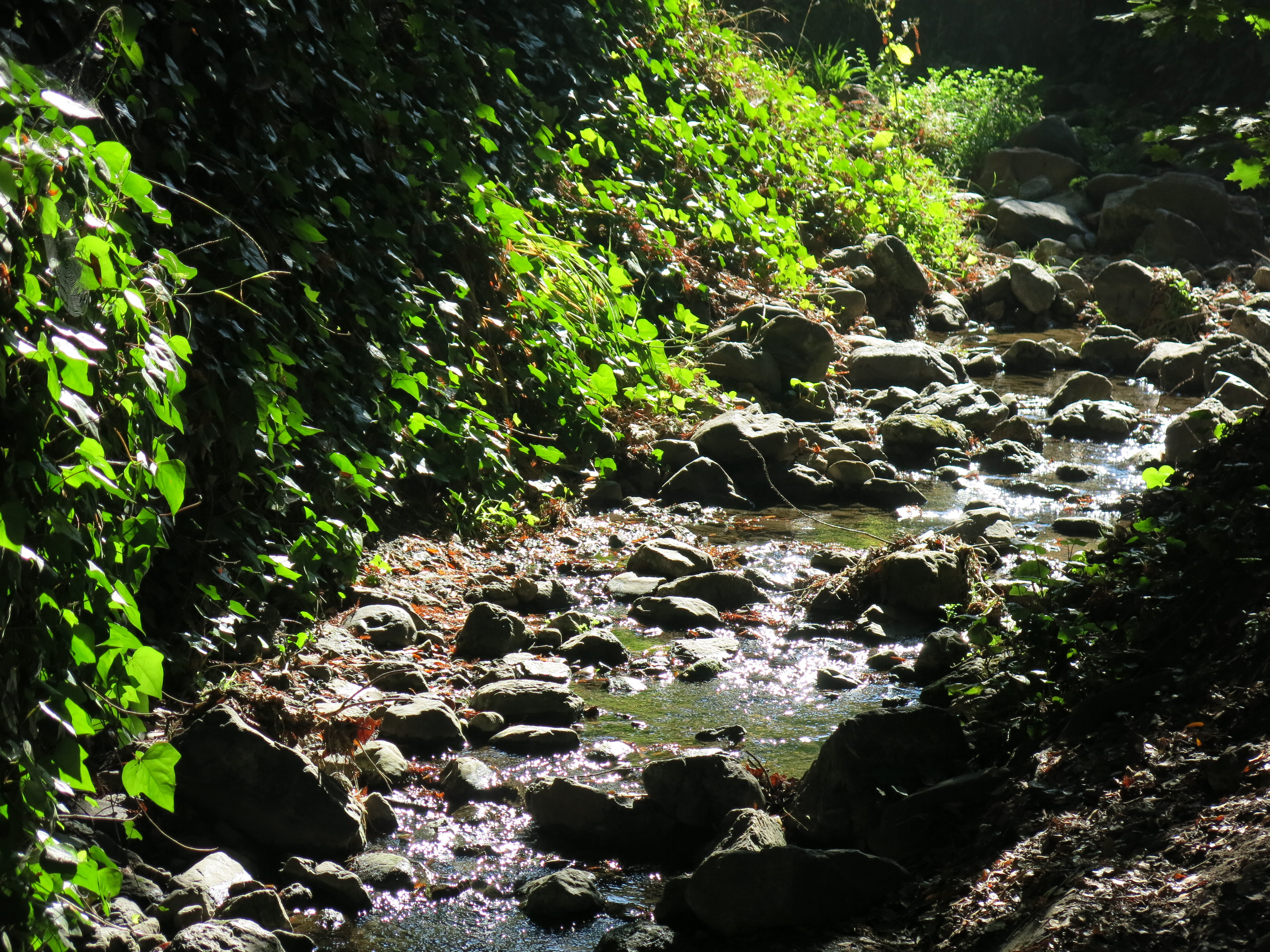
Codornices Creek

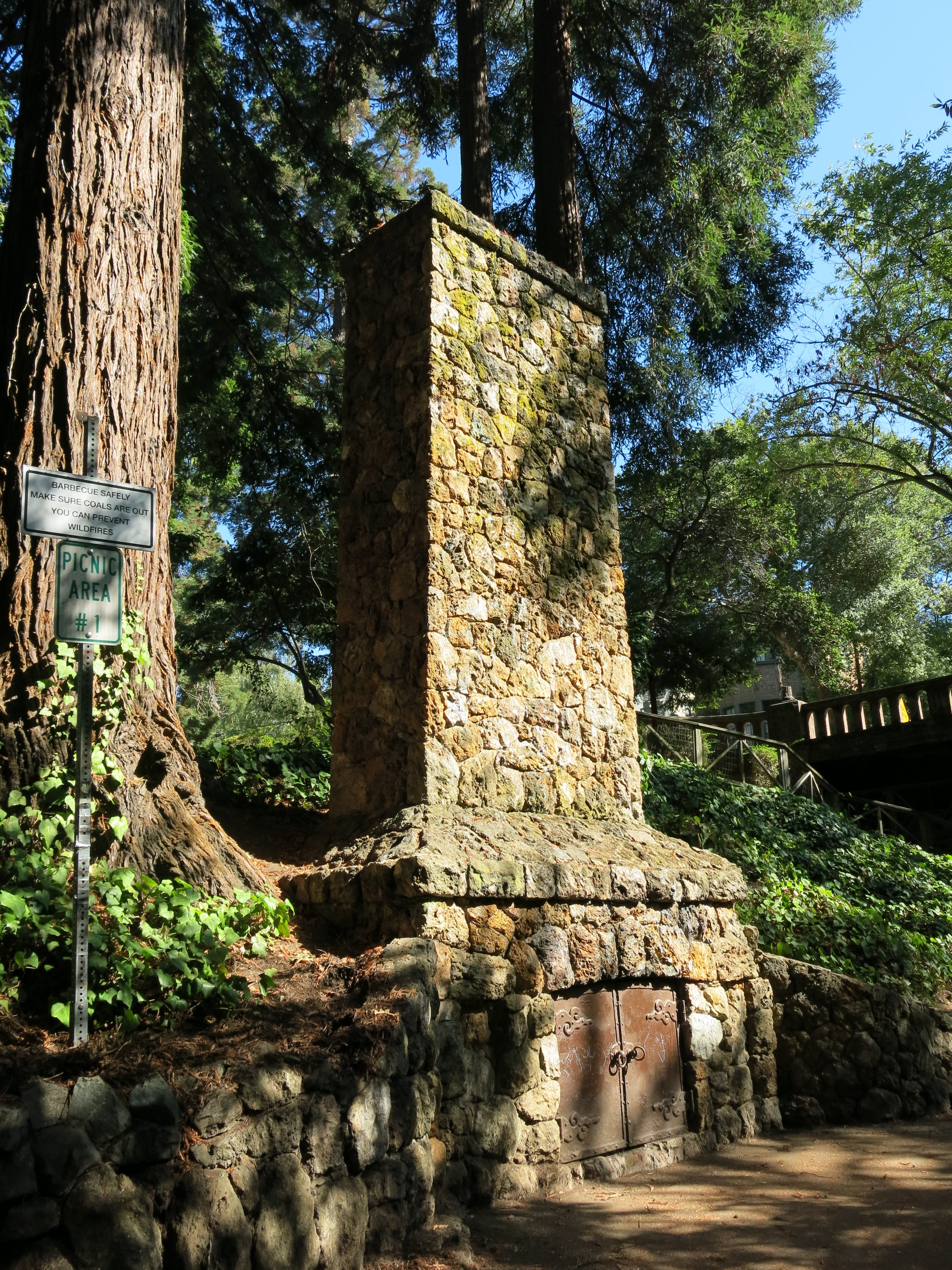
Stone Fireplace
Built in 1917

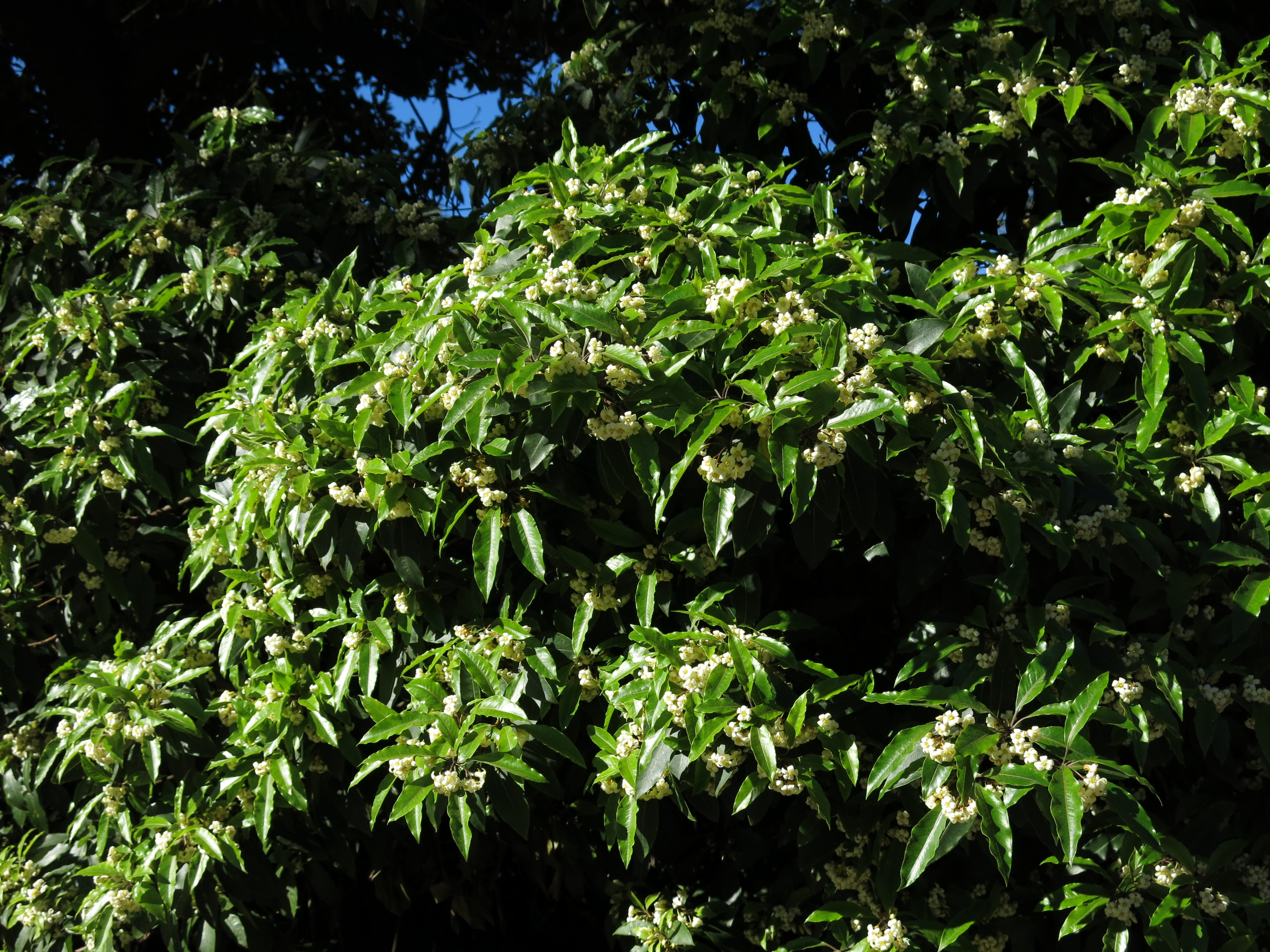
Pittosporum undulatum

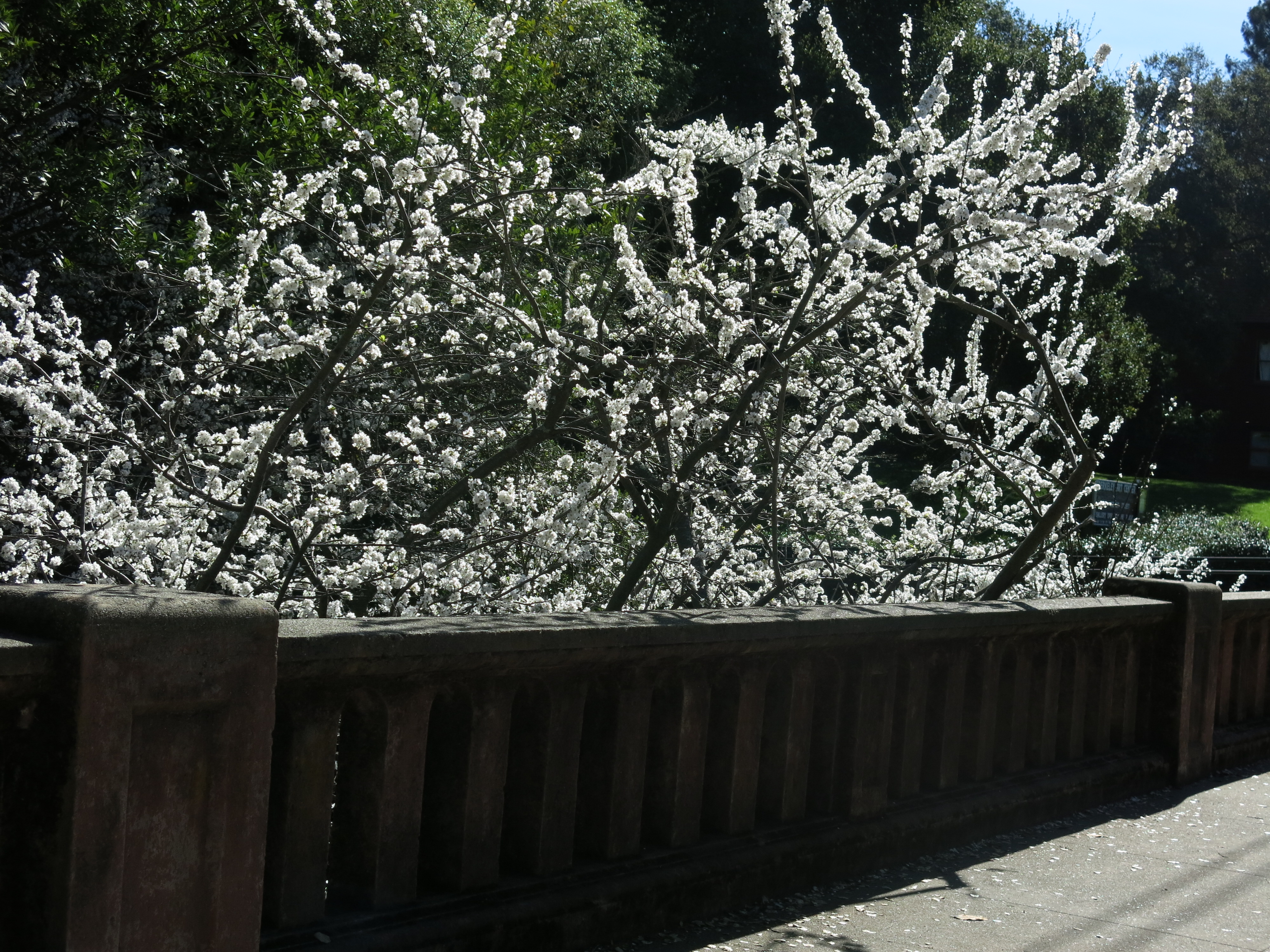
Prunus at Walnut Street Bridge

=== Garden for the City ===
Henry Berryman purchased the Byrne House with ten adjoining acres and it became known as the Berryman place. Envisioning a developing town, Henry Berryman, as owner of the Berkeley Waterworks, built the Berryman Reservoir (still located a few blocks above the Live Oak Park), and also extended the steam train line north on Shattuck to Vine Street (Berryman Station), both as measures to increase the desirability of his North Berkeley lots. A few of the earliest houses built then are still standing today.
When the extensive Byrne lands were subdivided by Henry Berryman in the 1870s, two parcels on Codornices Creek remained intact and were developed as a private estate. To the north of the creek was the home of Michael O´Toole and Russell Penniman owned the property to the south. On March 10, 1914, the City Council approved an ordinance appropriating $72.500 to purchase the property in order to establish a city park.
At that time Berkeley, like many other American cities, was swept up in the City Beautiful Movement, and had recently commissioned a report on city planning, which revealed a lack of public parks. The city took formal possession of the property on Juli 1 and the still unnamed park was opened to the public with appropriate ceremony. For the next two weeks everyone ´s mind was on choosing a name for the new park and suggestions were published almost daily in the Berkeley Gazette. Among those names proposed were “Penniman”, “Berryman”, and even “Whitehall” (the name of Bishop Berkeley's home). On July 14, 1914, the City Council adopted “Live Oak”. Several years later the park was extended one block to Oxford Street, Codornices Creek and its groves of both native and introduced trees were preserved.
One of the first improvements was the present Walnut Street Bridge, designed in 1915. In 1917 a large, stone Arts & Crafts fireplace was built, an in 1918 William Miles donated a rustic aviary. Penniman's brown shingle became the clubhouse and North Branch library.

=== Live Oak Community Center ===
When the Penniman Clubhouse burned in 1951 the city built the current Live Oak Community Center, the "Live Oak Park Recreation Center, Social Hall Shattuck & Berryman, Berkeley, California", where such groups as the "Berkeley Folk Dancers" have their home. The Berkeley Art Center is now situated on the east side of Walnut Street Bridge. The Live Oak Park is a free public park. Between the tennis court and the park is a public restroom available; the picnic sites with the stone fireplace and other activities are available for single persons and groups. A quick and easy way to search and register for programs and classes can be found on the internet.
