= Rosie Lee Tompkins =

African-American quilter (1936–2006)

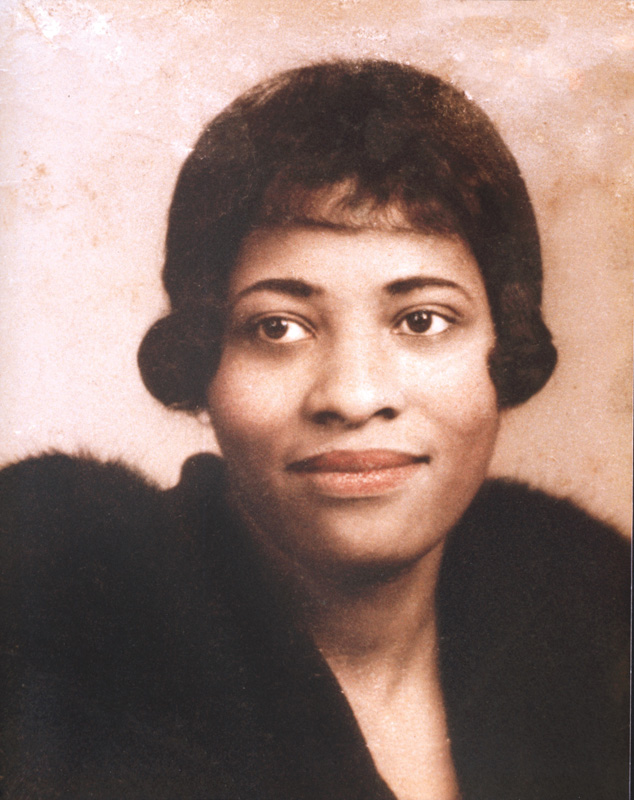
- Born: Effie Mae Martin Howard; September 6, 1936; Arkansas
- Died: December 1, 2006 (aged 70); Richmond, California
- Known for: African-American quilter

Rosie Lee Tompkins (1936–2006) is the art pseudonym of Effie Mae Martin Howard, a widely acclaimed African-American quiltmaker and fiber artist of Richmond, California. The Los Angeles Times described her work as "stunning, improvisational quilts that fuse organic form with vivid, patterned geometry to create abstract narratives of individual devotion." Later, The New York Times called her "one of the great American artists," and her work "one of the century’s major artistic accomplishments." More than 500 works by Tompkins reside at the Berkeley Art Museum and Pacific Film Archive.

== Early life ==
Born Effie Mae Martin, she was born September 6, 1936, to a sharecropping family in southeastern Arkansas. She was the oldest of 15 half-siblings, growing up working picking cotton and piecing quilts with her mother.

== Work ==
Tompkins, who had helped her mother make quilts as a child, began to quilt seriously about 1980, while making a living as a practical nurse in the Bay Area. She said she believed God directed her hand and her art. Her abstract, improvisational compositions often had a personal significance: one of her more well-known works, "Three Sixes," involves three relatives whose birthdays include the number 6.

Despite the fact that she was a deeply private person and rarely sold her quilts, her work was discovered in 1985 by Eli Leon, an Oakland-based collector specializing in African-American quilts. Leon featured her work on the cover of the catalog for an exhibition he organized, Who'd A Thought It: Improvisation in African-American Quiltmaking, which debuted at the San Francisco Craft and Folk Art Museum in 1987 and traveled for several years. Tompkins' quilts were featured in a solo exhibition at the Berkeley Art Museum and Pacific Film Archive (BAMPFA) in 1997, at Peter Blum Gallery in New York City in 2003, and at the Shelburne Museum in Vermont in 2007. They were also included in the 2002 Biennial of the Whitney Museum of American Art and have been shown at the National Museum of Women in the Arts in Washington, DC; one image is available on their web site. In 2016, her quilts were featured in an exhibition of five quilt artists at the Oakland Museum of California.

The curator of the Berkeley show, Lawrence Rinder, wrote:

In front of Tompkins's work I feel that certain Modernist ambitions may in fact be achievable. Here are feelings of awe, elation, and sublimity; here is an absolute mastery of color, texture and composition; here is inventiveness and originality so palpable and intense that each work seems like a new and total risk, a risk so extreme that only utter faith in the power of the creative spirit could have engendered it."

Critics were equal in their praise: "Tompkins' textile art [works] ... demolish the category"; "These quilts are works of such distinction and devotion that they supersede established art-historical categories, forcing reviewers to retreat to that dumbfounded admiration that attracted us to art in the first place".

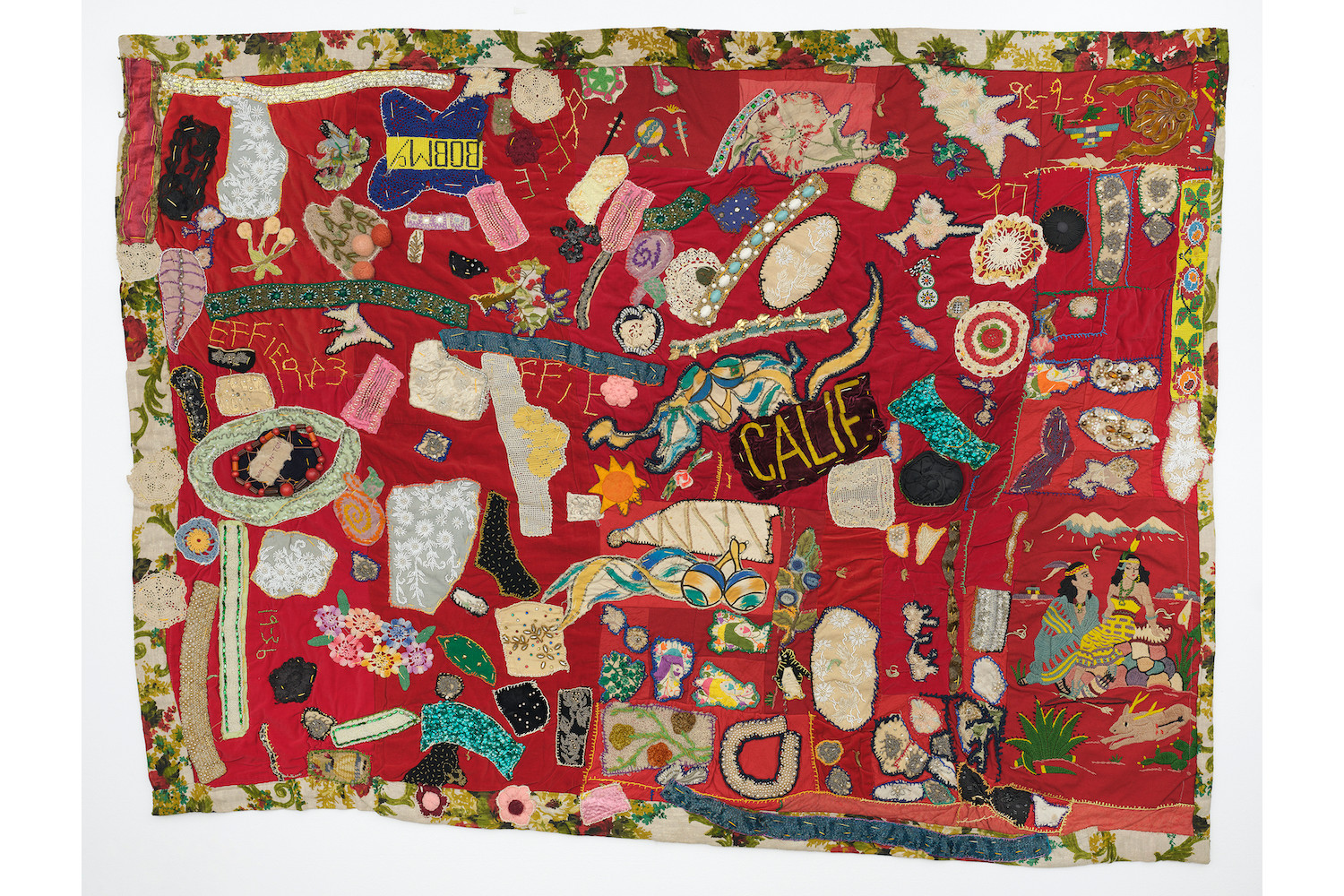
Untitled, Rosie Lee Tompkins, 1968, 1982-3, 1996. Cotton, wool, felt, velvet, velveteen, found and repurposed embroidered fragments, crocheted dollies, silk crepe, decorative trim, cotton threaded embroidery, and printed drapery. 57 x 75 in. Photography by Eli Leon. Berkeley Art Museum and Pacific Film Archive.

Throughout her career, Tompkins focused much of her work on storytelling as well as religious themes. Tompkins was deeply religious and used this as the main motivator in creating her quilts.

== Artwork ==
Works pieced by Tompkins include Tents of Armageddon Four Patch (1986), Three Sixes (1987), Half-Squares Put-Together (1988), Half-Squares Medallion (1986), Half-squares Four-patch (1986), and Put Together with Letter "F" (1985).

=== Style and materials ===
Tompkins's quilts were not made from old clothes or other scraps but from fabrics she purchased for their textures and light-reflecting qualities, including velvet, fake fur, wool, silk and Lurex. She worked with the convention of the quilt block but with enormous variation in size, free distortions of shape and vivid color contrasts that have been described as "geometric anarchy" and "riotous mosaics."

== Tompkins' Retrospective at BAMPFA ==
In 2019, as a bequest, the Berkeley Art Museum and Pacific Film Archive (BAMPFA) acquired the Eli Leon Collection of almost 3,000 works by African-American quilt makers, including more than 500 works by Tompkins, which will find a permanent home at the museum. Drawing from the Eli Leon Collection, BAMPFA presented Rosie Lee Tompkins: A Retrospective. The exhibition, which opened February 19, 2020, closed prematurely due to COVID-19 shut-down, but not before The New York Times called it "a triumphal retrospective" that "confirms her standing as one of the great American artists–transcending craft, challenging painting and reshaping the canon."

Drawing on the larger Eli Leon Collection, BAMPFA organized the exhibition Routed West: Twentieth Century African American Quilts in California (June 8, 2025—November 30, 2025), which included work by Tompkins, and published a book with the same title. On the eve of the show's opening, approximately $230,000 in conservation funds from an Institute of Museum and Library Services "Save America’s Treasures" grant was revoked by an executive order from Donald Trump, placing the museum, the collection, and the legacy of Rosie Lee Tompkins squarely in the crosshairs of the Trump Administration's "war on woke."

== Personal life ==
She was married and divorced twice. "Howard" was a married name. She was reclusive and fiercely protective of her privacy and the right to privacy of family. Family included her mother; several children and stepchildren; and many siblings, grandchildren and great-grandchildren who survived her.

== Death ==
Tompkins was found dead at her home in Richmond, California, on Friday December 1, 2006. She died aged 70.

== In popular culture ==
The song "Rosie Lee" on the 2024 album Pickpocket by Eliza Hardy Jones is "a driving Americana groove about [the] famous quilter."
