= Lu Xun Academy of Fine Arts =

Art school in Shenyang, China

- 鲁迅美术学院
- Former name: Luxun Academy of Arts
- Established: 1938
- Location: Shenyang, Liaoning, China; 41.7762°N 123.4291°E
- Website: www.lumei.edu.cn

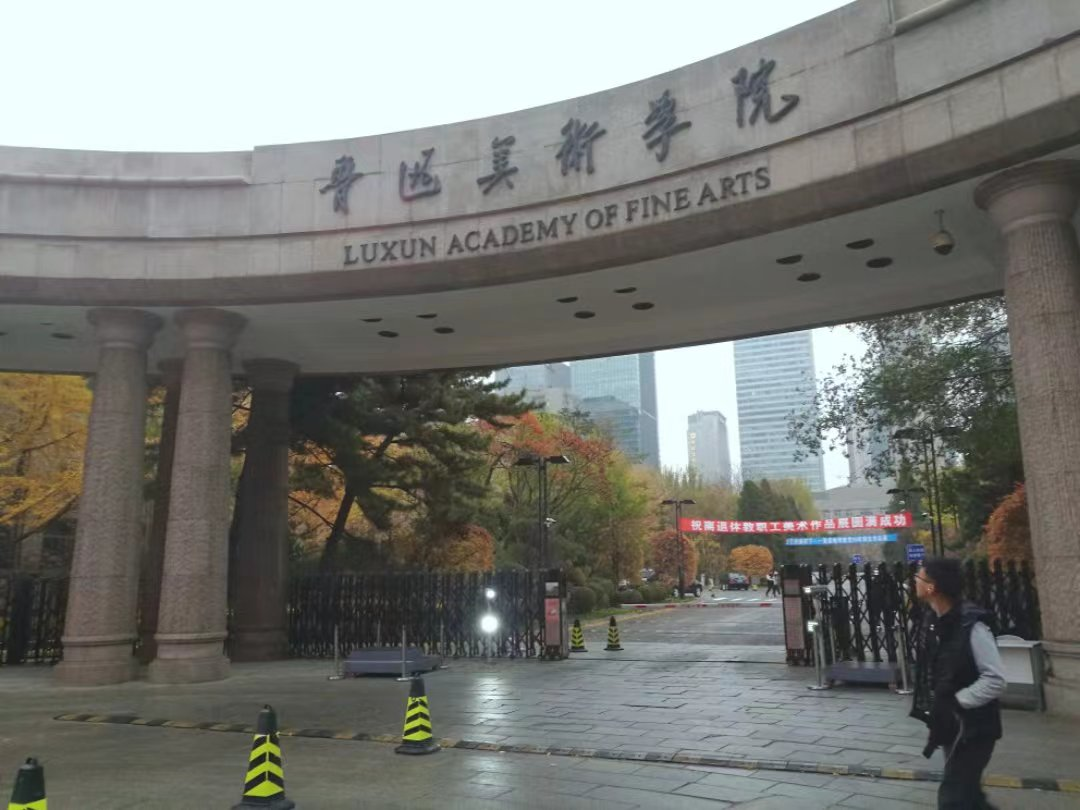
School Gate

Lu Xun Academy of Fine Arts, or LAFA, is an art school in Shenyang, Liaoning Province, China. It was founded in April 1938 in the Yan'an Soviet as the Lu Xun Academy of Arts (or Luyi) as a training center for Chinese Communist Party artists.

== History ==
The school was founded in April 1938 as Lu Xun Academy of Arts (or Luyi) by Chinese Communist Party (CCP) leaders, including Mao Zedong and Zhou Enlai, in the town of Yan'an, Shaanxi Province, as a training center for Communist artists. On 2 August 1939, Luyi moved into the Qiao'ergou Catholic Church, where it became a cultural center for Yan'an. Many artists moved to the Yan'an Soviet and worked in propaganda or as instructors at the academy.

Like other cultural institutions in Yan'an, the academy focused on building support for resistance against the invading Japanese forces during the Second Sino-Japanese War.

During the Yan'an Rectification Movement, the academy increased its focus on local artistic customs and folk art.

The school had a significant role in the Yangge Movement (late 1942 to 1946). The movement adapted the traditional dance genre of yangge to incorporate socialist themes.

Artists of the academy adapted folklore into the opera of The White-Haired Girl. The opera was first performed in April 1945 in Yan'an as a tribute to the Seventh National Congress of the CCP. It was one of the first large scale theatrical productions created in Yan'an.

Between 1938 and 1945, the academy had over 50 faculty, as hundred administrative and research staff members, and almost 700 graduates.

After the CCP victory in the Chinese Civil War and the 1949 proclamation of the People's Republic of China, graduates of the academy filled leadership roles throughout the arts establishments.

The school moved to Shenyang in 1945, spun off its music department in 1953 (which later became Shenyang Conservatory of Music), and was renamed Lu Xun Academy of Fine Arts in 1958.

The composers of the original Lu Xun Academy in Yan'an and Shenyang include Ma Ke (composer) who composed the opera The White-Haired Girl, Chen Zi composer of the 1954 Liu Hulan (opera) and others.

== Campus ==
The Lu Xun Academy of Fine Arts has two campuses: Shenyang Campus in downtown Shenyang, and Dalian Campus in Jinshitan, Dalian.

== Alumni ==
- Jia Aili
- Wang Bing
- Lin Fei Fei
- Luo Yang
- Wanxin Zhang
