= Lin Fei Fei =

Chinese muralist

- Born: Dalian
- Alma mater: Lu Xun Academy of Fine Arts
- Occupation: Muralist

Lin Fei Fei (Chinese: 林斐斐; born circa 1988) is a Chinese-born muralist based in Sacramento, California. She was named one of 10 "Contemporary Chinese Artists of the Future" by the Wang Shikuo Art Foundation in 2016 and has had her work displayed internationally.

== Biography ==
Lin was born circa 1988 in Da Lian, China. She was born during China's One Child Policy and since she was her family's second child they had to pay a fine in order to keep her. She graduated from Lu Xun Academy of Fine Arts with a bachelor's in oil painting in 2011 and master's degrees in oil painting in 2014. She studied printmaking at the Oslo National Academy of the Arts in 2013. She is best known for her mural, which often utilize few colors and have recurring themes of darkness, self-discovery, and exploring human experience and emotions. She has also stated she is inspired by European artists, such as Michelangelo, Raphael, and Leonardo Da Vinci.

In August 2015, Lin moved from China to Sacramento, California with her boyfriend. In 2016, the Wang Shikuo Art Foundation named her one of 10 "Contemporary Chinese Artists of the Future." She helped create the 2016 "East Meets West International Art Exhibition" at the Jolie Gallery in Shenyang. In 2017 she helped organize the second "East Meets West International Art Exhibition" at the Jolie Gallery with 18 Sacramento based artists.

In April 2018, she won the fan vote for best design at the event Paint the Park: A Celebration of Sacramento Art in Papa Murphy's Park for her mural "Fútbol in Action." She was honored at the Sacramento Republic FC home match against Tulsa Roughnecks FC on April 28, 2018 during halftime. In August 2018, Lin was a part of the Wide Open Walls mural festival. Between 2018 and 2019, she also painted four murals around Oakland, California. In 2019, her show "Not Your Bunny" included a giant mural of rabbit on the WAL Public Market on 6th Street in Downtown Sacramento, which was displayed until May 1, 2019.

Lin's 2020 exhibit "The Distance Between Black and White," which opened in early March at the Dwellpoint gallery in Sacramento ended early due to the COVID-19 pandemic. Also in 2020, Lin started her series "Introspection" that consisted of murals Mexico City, Sacramento, New York City, Denver, and Guadalajara. In 2021, Lin participated in the Babes Walls mural festival in Arvada, Colorado.
