= Rick Dillingham =

- Born: James Richard Dillingham II; November 13, 1952; Lake Forest, Illinois, USA
- Died: January 22, 1994 (aged 41); Santa Fe, New Mexico, USA
- Education: University of New Mexico; Claremont Graduate School of Scripps College
- Known for: ceramic art, writing
- Movement: American raku; pit fired pottery

pot by Rick Dillingham inspired by pottery of the Ancestral Puebloan people, collection Albuquerque Museum

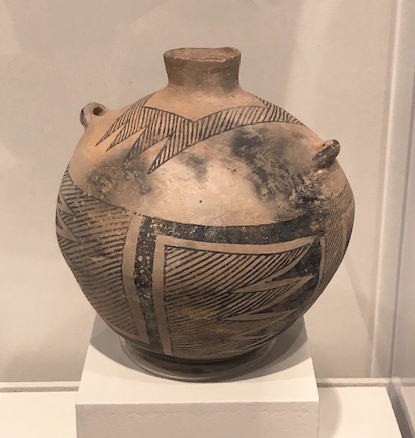
Ancestral Puebloan Socorro Black on White ware jar c. 1050–1300

Rick Dillingham (1952–1994) was an American ceramic artist, scholar, collector and museum professional best known for his broken pot technique and scholarly publications on Pueblo pottery.

== Education ==
From 1968-1970, Dillingham attended Ventura Junior College, also in 1970 he attended Moorpark Junior College, both in Ventura County, California. In 1970-1971 he attended the California College of the Arts in Oakland, California.

Dillingham received a Bachelor of Fine Arts degree in 1974 from the University of New Mexico. After graduating with his BFA, Dillingham went on to Claremont Graduate School of Scripps College, where he studied with Paul Soldner. He received an MFA degree in 1976 from Claremont Graduate School.

== Biography ==
Rick Dillingham was born to Dil and Nancy Dillingham in Lake Forest, Illinois on November 13, 1952, and raised in Southern California. He began working with ceramics as early as 1965, working with a potter's wheel to create thrown pottery vessels. He moved to Albuquerque, New Mexico in 1971 to study at the University of New Mexico. While he was a student there he worked at the campus' Maxwell Museum of Anthropology. Part of his work there entailed repairing broken pots of the Southwest indigenous peoples. He also worked for a time as a restorer of historical Native American pottery at the Museum of New Mexico, Laboratory of Anthropology in Santa Fe.

In 1974 he curated and wrote the catalog for the Maxwell Museum's exhibition, Seven Families in Pueblo Pottery.

Dillingham curated numerous exhibitions, exhibited his own work nationally, and lectured on Native American pottery. He was also a collector of Puebloan pottery. His collection of pottery of the Mojave Desert indigenous peoples is one of the "largest and most complete" in the United States; it is housed at the Indian Arts Research Center of the School of American Research.

Dillingham was a scholar of Native American pottery who published widely and authored three books on Pueblo ceramics, Acoma and Laguna Pottery, Seven Families in Pueblo Pottery, and Fourteen Families in Pueblo Pottery. He developed many personal relationships with Pueblo artists during his lifetime.

His own ceramic work was inspired by the pottery of the Ancestral Puebloan people.

== Art ==
In 1972 Dillingham began a series of ceramic gasoline can sculptures as a commentary on American car culture and gasoline-dependent modern lifestyles. These vessels harkened back to traditional Pueblo-style ceramic water jars, but with a socio-political message. The following year the Middle East oil embargo began, and the ensuing American "oil crisis". He continued to produce this series for over a decade.

Rick Dillingham, Vase, 1981, an example of his deliberately broken-and-reassembled pots, collection Everson Museum of Art

Dillingham's experience studying and repairing Native American pots, as well as his interest in anthropology influenced his own art work. He was inspired by the ceramics shards of Mimbres pottery of the Mogollon cultures of the American Southwest, in particular the Mimbres perforated burial pots. He was also influenced by teacher Hal Riegger and artist Beatrice Wood. He is known for pioneering a process in which he hand-built a vessel, pit-fired it, deliberately broke it into shards, randomly painted both sides of each shard, then refired and reassembled the individual pieces and finally added additional metallic decoration. Dillingham's vessels were produced by coil or slab work. He used traditional methods of using clay from local sources, and raku or dung firing his ceramics without a kiln.

== Awards and honors ==
Dillingham received two fellowships from the National Endowment for the Arts in 1977 and 1983, and a grant from the Louis Comfort Tiffany Foundation in 1989.

== Collections ==
Dillingham's work can be found in the permanent collections of the Smithsonian American Art Museum, The Metropolitan Museum of Art, Los Angeles County Museum of Art, the Victoria and Albert Museum, London, the Mint Museum of Craft and Design, and the Albuquerque Museum. His work is also found in the collections of the Brooklyn Museum, the Cleveland Museum of Art, the Everson Museum of Art, the Utah Museum of Fine Arts, among others. Twenty of Dillingham's works are in the permanent collection of the New Mexico Museum of Art.

== Death ==
Dillingham contracted the AIDS virus yet continued "living well with the disease", even riding cross-country to attend a Harley-Davidson convention with his oxygen tank strapped to the back of his motorcycle. Towards the end of his life he worked on his "Black Bowl, AIDS Series" of blackware vessels. In 1994, Dillingham died at home at age 41 in Santa Fe of complications from AIDS. Dillingham appears on the AIDS Memorial Quilt, his panel having a style reminiscent of many of his works.

== Legacy ==
The University of New Mexico press posthumously released the book Fourteen Families in Pueblo Pottery, an expansion of his book Seven Families in Pueblo Pottery.

An archive of Dillingham's correspondence, notebooks, photographic materials and ephemera is located in the New Mexico Museum of Art library and archives. Additional archive material is located in the photography archives of the Palace of the Governors in Santa Fe.
