= Anne Hirondelle =

American ceramicist (born 1944)

- Born: 1944 (age 81–82); Vancouver, Washington
- Education: University of Puget Sound; Stanford University
- Known for: ceramics
- Style: abstract

Anne Hirondelle (née Harvey; born 1944 in Vancouver, Washington) is an American ceramicist known for her approaches to both the form and function of her pieces.

== Career ==
Early in her career, she created ceramics that took the form of traditional commercial pottery, such as pitchers and jars. In recent years, she has shifted her approach to create works that are more sculptural and less functional. These abstract pieces may be semi-spheres with sections missing; a series of layered and overlapping arcs; or a coil that continuously loops back on itself, becoming a towering spiral. As such, her creative process frequently begins not with throwing or sculpting, but with drawing and planning.

Hirondelle now lives and works out of Port Townsend, WA, with her husband.

== Education ==
In 1966, Hirondelle graduated from the University of Puget Sound with a bachelor's degree in English. The following year, she graduated with an master's degree in counseling psychology from Stanford University then she served as the director of the University of Seattle's Young Women's Christian Association for five years.

From 1973 until 1974, Hirondelle attended law school at the University of Washington, intending to work for women's issues. During her time there, she enrolled in ceramics classes at the Factory of Visual Arts in Seattle. She decided to quit law school and she began attending the University of Washington's School of Art in 1974, earning her BFA in 1976.

== Career ==
After time spent creating pieces inspired by traditional ceramics and architecture, Hirondelle began looking for ways to revitalize the production process. As a first alternative to glazing her ceramic pieces, Hirondelle ceased glazing them at all. Later, she began applying acrylic or latex paints to the pieces, sometimes painting the entire piece, sometimes painting only the lip or edge of the piece, preferring to allow the white clay to stay untouched.

She regularly addresses feminine issues in her work. Hirondelle's ceramic series "Outurn," which she created in the early 2000s, is anatomically suggestive of the vagina. In another series, titled "Tumble," Hirondelle used color to suggest women's sexuality: the outer edges of the pieces remain uncolored, but the inside crevices are rendered in vivid paint. One of her pieces, "Abouturn Grid," was purchased by Centrum in Port Townsend.

== Awards ==
Hirondelle's work has earned her several recognitions throughout her career. In 1988, she was a recipient of a National Endowment for the Arts Fellowship in Visual Arts. In 1993, she received First Place in Women in Washington: The First Century. She was a finalist for the Seattle Art Museum's Betty Bowen Award in 2004. Five years later, she received the Twining Humber Award for Lifetime Artistic Achievement. In 2014, she was one of only four artists chosen to participate in the Joan Mitchell Foundation's Creating a Living Legacy, a program designed to help artists preserve, document, and archive their work.

== Museum collections ==
Her works are held in the following collections:

- Arizona State University, Tempe, AZ
- Boise State University, Boise, ID
- Crocker Art Museum, Sacramento, CA
- Fine Arts Museum, San Francisco, CA
- Fuller Craft Museum, Brockton, MA
- Los Angeles County Museum of Art, Los Angeles, CA
- Museum of Arts and Design, New York, NY
- Tacoma Art Museum, Tacoma, WA
- University of Iowa Stanley Museum of Art, Iowa City, IA
