= Laverne Brackens =

African-American quiltmaker (born 1927)

- Born: 1927 (age 98–99)
- Style: Quiltmaking, textile arts
- Awards: National Heritage Fellowship
- Website: quiltsofcolorbylaverne.com

Laverne Brackens (born 1927) is an American quilt maker and textile artist from Fairfield, Texas. Brackens is noted for her work in the tradition of African-American improvisational quilt making. In 2011 she was recognized with a National Heritage Fellowship by the National Endowment for the Arts.

== Biography ==
Brackens was born in 1927. She grew up in Fairfield, Texas, the oldest daughter of eight children. She learned quilt making from her mother, and whom she helped by tacking quilts.

Brackens married at age 18 and she and her husband shared eight children. Brackens worked to support her family as a restaurant cook. Brackens did not start making quilts for herself until 1987, when she retired from her restaurant career after an accident with a food cart.

=== Technique ===
Brackens is known for her use of color and distinctive shapes in her quilts, such as dogs, cowboy boots, and elephants. She does not use patterns in her designs, instead improvising the design as she quilts. Brackens has described the inspiration for her quilts as coming to her in her dreams.

Brackens has taught her distinctive quilt making to her daughters and grandchildren.

=== Honors ===
In 2011, the National Endowment for the Arts recognized Brackens with a National Heritage Fellowship for her craftwork. That year, Michelle Obama commissioned Brackens to create a quilted shawl to be gifted to South Korea.

Brackens quilts were collected in abundance by Eli Leon. After Leon's death, more than 300 quilts by Brackens were donated from his collection to the UC Berkeley Art Museum and Pacific Film Archive.

== Collections ==
- "Strip", 2019, Los Angeles County Museum of Art
- "Roman stripe medallion quilt", 1992, Fine Arts Museums of San Francisco

== See also ==
- History of quilting
- Crazy quilting
