= Pilar Agüero-Esparza =

Mexican-American painter (born 1966)

Pilar Agüero-Esparza (born 1966) is a Mexican-American painter, sculptor, and art educator. She is known for her works, particularly in mixed media, focusing on issues of skin tone, ethnic identity, labor, and domesticity.

== Biography ==
Pilar Agüero-Esparza was born in Los Angeles and grew up in the Boyle Heights neighborhood of East L.A. She credits her parents’ shoe shop for exposing her to the “potential and richness of materials” that informs much of her work. After receiving a Bachelor of Arts degree in art from the University of California, Santa Cruz, Agüero-Esparza went on to earn a Master of Fine Arts in spatial art from San Jose State University. Since the 1990s, she has been an active artist throughout the San Francisco Bay Area in particular, contributing works to exhibitions at the De Young Museum in San Francisco and Triton Museum of Art at the Yerba Buena Center for the Arts (YBCA). Her work explores themes of labor, domesticity, and representations of color in pieces that incorporate materials such as “skin-tone” crayons and woven leather. An educator and arts administrator, Agüero-Esparza states that she wishes to use her education and experience to help developing artists find their voices and navigate the artistic world.

== Selected artwork ==
=== Homework House ===
Agüero-Esparza was inspired by everyday objects like her daughter's homework. She says, “I started collecting the papers. I [thought], ‘Is this right, having these little kids do all this rote work? Are we doing them a disservice?’”. Agüero-Esparza sewed the papers into a quilt in the shape of a house, creating her 2009 installation piece “Homework House.”

=== Multicultural Crayons ===
Questioning the issues of “ownership” that arose from the release of a box of “skin-tone” crayons, Agüero-Esparza melted down these crayons and cast the feet of her daughter, then age ten, in different colors. The resulting series of cast feet became the 2010 installation “Multicultural Crayons.”

=== Stratum / Merging ===
Agüero-Esparza made this piece as part of a 2019 Richmond Art Center exhibition exploring “the interchange of ideas and material, the crisscrossing of bodies and objects, and the weaving of histories and personal narratives”. A wooden board is painted in acrylic with “skin-tone” colored lines, then merged with a woven square of leather strips in similar hues.
