= Berkeley Art Museum and Pacific Film Archive =

University art museum, movie theater, and archive

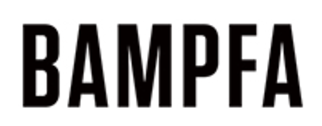
- Established: 1963
- Location: 2155 Center Street; Berkeley, CA 94720
- Coordinates: 37°52′16″N 122°15′59″W
- Type: art museum, film archive
- Key holdings: Hans Hofmann; Eli Leon Collection of African-American quilts; Steven Leiber Collection of Conceptual art; Abu Ghraib Series by Fernando Botero; Japanese films
- Collection size: 25,000
- Director: Julie Rodrigues Widholm
- Architects: Mario Ciampi (1970); Diller Scofidio + Renfro (2016)
- Website: bampfa.org

The Berkeley Art Museum and Pacific Film Archive (BAMPFA, formerly abbreviated as BAM/PFA) are a combined art museum, repertory movie theater, and film archive associated with the University of California, Berkeley. Jules Rodrigues Widholm is the current Executive Director since August 2020. She succeeds Lawrence Rinder who served from 2008 to 2020. The museum is a member of the North American Reciprocal Museums program.

== Collection ==
=== Art ===
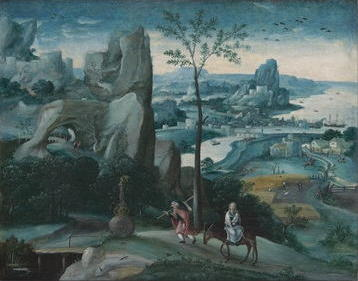
The collection's first object: Flight into Egypt.

The University of California art collection began with Flight into Egypt, a 16th-century oil on wood panel by the School of Joachim Patinir which was gifted to the University by San Francisco banker and financier François Louis Alfred Pioche in 1870. 1881 saw the opening of the Bacon Art and Library Building, named for Henry Douglas Bacon, who donated half the funds for its construction, his library, and several paintings, including Albert Bierstadt's Yosemite Winter Scene (1872).

The museum was officially founded in 1963 after a donation was made to the university from artist and teacher Hans Hofmann of 45 paintings plus $250,000. A competition to design a building was announced in 1964, and the museum, designed by Mario Ciampi, and associates Ronald Wagner and Richard Jurasch, opened in 1970. Founding Director Peter Selz, formerly of the Museum of Modern Art in New York, served from 1965 to 1973 and played a key role in establishing the museum, championing unorthodox Bay Area artists. He was succeeded by James Elliott, who served as director until 1988.

The museum has shown the works of Ant Farm, Joe Brainard, Joan Brown, Theresa Hak Kyung Cha, Robert Colescott, Jay DeFeo, Juan Gris, Eva Hesse, Paul Kos, Robert Mapplethorpe, Barry McGee, Richard Misrach, Bruce Nauman, Peter Paul Rubens, Martin Puryear, Sebastião Salgado, William Wiley, and many others.

The museum also features the MATRIX Program for Contemporary Art, founded in 1978 by James Elliott. MATRIX has featured artists such as Zarouhie Abdalian, Michael Armitage, Geta Brătescu, Cecilia Edefalk, Paz Errázuriz, Nicole Eisenman, Myoko Ito, Anna Maria Maiolino, Otobong Nkanga, Will Rogan, Linda Stark, and John Zurier.

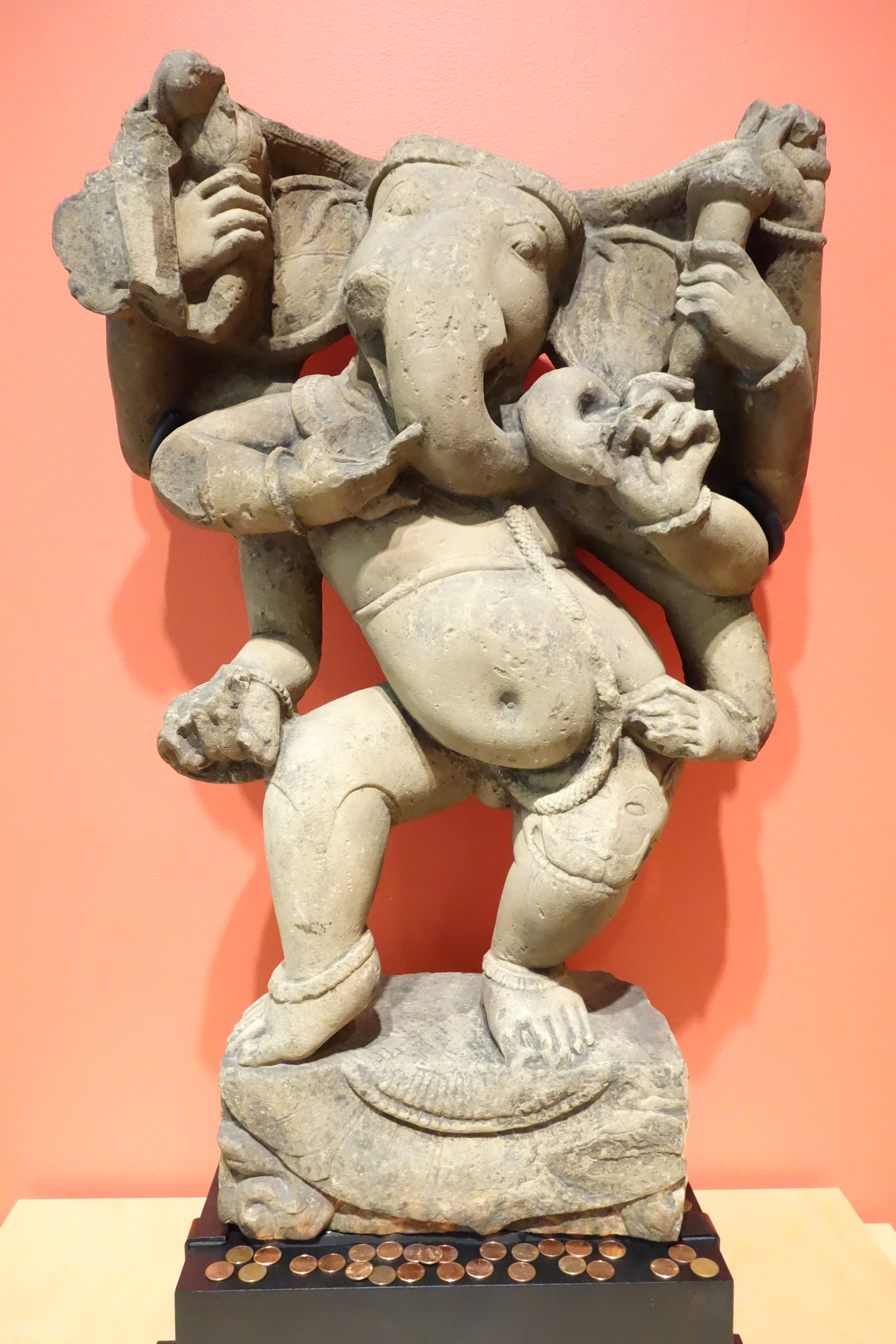
Sandstone statue of Ganesha, India, 10th century.

Past curators on the staff of the museum include David A. Ross, Mark Rosenthal, Constance Lewallen, Lucinda Barnes, Michael Auping, and Apsara DiQuinzio.

In 2009, the museum acquired (as a gift from the artist) 56 paintings and drawings from the Abu Ghraib Series by Fernando Botero. Selections from the series have been regularly included in the museum's annual Art for Human Rights exhibitions.

In 2014, the museum acquired San Francisco collector and dealer Steven Leiber's collection of Conceptual art and art materials, as well as his library of reference and artists' books related to Conceptualism and the Fluxus movement. According to The New York Times, "with the acquisition…the museum and film archive will become one of the world’s most important centers for the study of Conceptual art."

In 2019, as a bequest, the museum acquired the Eli Leon Collection of almost 3,000 works by African-American quilt makers, including more than 500 works by Rosie Lee Tompkins. The collection now accounts for about 15 percent of the museum's art collection. Drawing from the Eli Leon Collection, BAMPFA presented Rosie Lee Tompkins: A Retrospective in 2020; The New York Times called it "a triumphal retrospective" that "confirms her standing as one of the great American artists–transcending craft, challenging painting and reshaping the canon." Drawing on the larger collection, BAMPFA organized the exhibition Routed West: Twentieth Century African American Quilts in California (June 8, 2025—November 30, 2025) and published a book with the same title. On the eve of the show's opening, approximately $230,000 in conservation funds from an Institute of Museum and Library Services "Save America’s Treasures" grant was revoked by an executive order from Donald Trump, placing the museum and the collection squarely in the crosshairs of the Trump Administration's "war on woke."

In 2021, a gift from the Richard and Mary L. Gray Collection added 15 significant works on paper to the collection, by artists including Guercino, Tiepolo, Guardi, Géricault, Juan Gris, Paul Klee, and Miró.

=== Film ===
The Pacific Film Archive (PFA) was founded in 1967 by Sheldon Renan, who began screening films on the UC campus in 1966 and was appointed Director of the new PFA. The PFA specializes in programming films "in a theoretical or critical context—exploring, for example, film noir in the context of the post-war ethos." Lectures by film scholars and visits from filmmakers further contextualize the programming. The archive houses 18,000 films and videos, including the largest collection of Japanese films outside of Japan. The PFA also includes a library and study center, and maintains online catalogs of its films and books and an online database of documentation associated with the films.

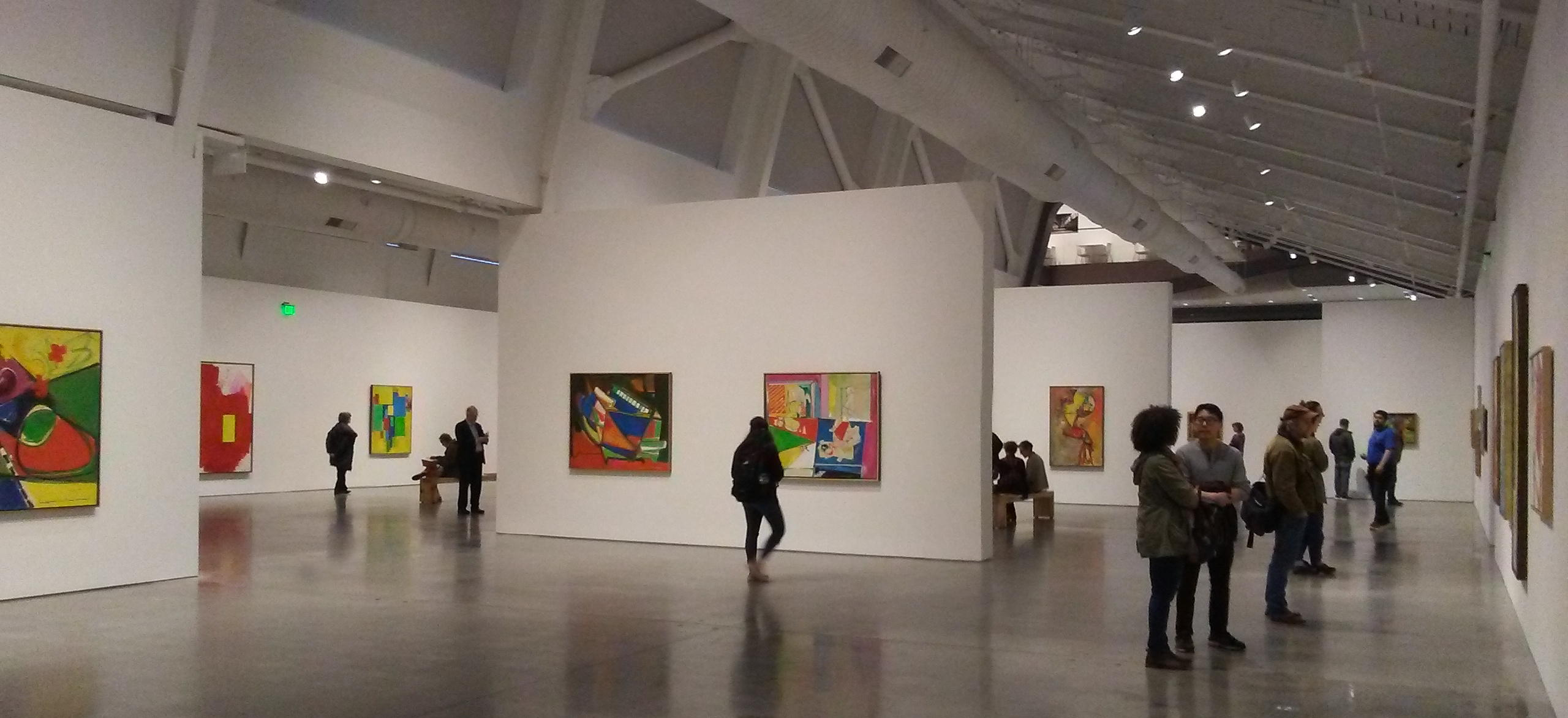
BAMPFA's major retrospective in March 2019 of the work of Hans Hofmann, who was instrumental in the creation of the museum. Photo by Steven Saylor.

== Buildings ==
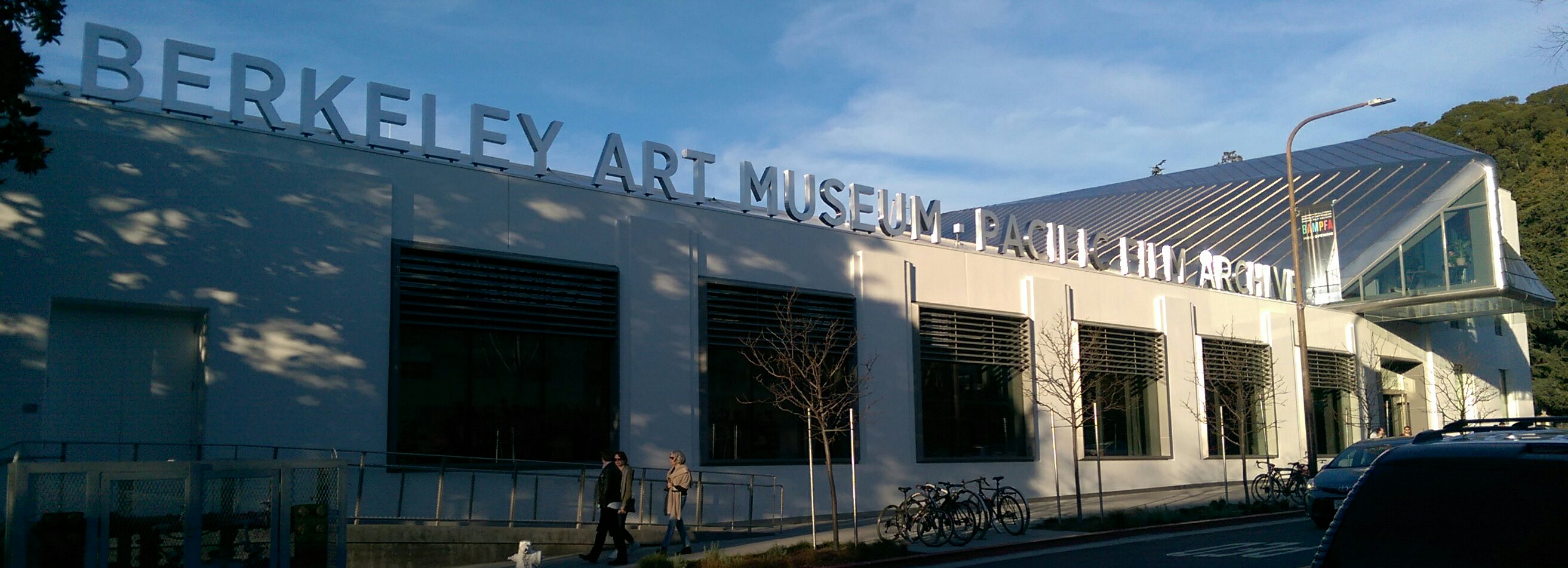

The former Berkeley Art Museum building was designed by Mario Ciampi and associates Ronald E. Wagner and Richard Jurasch and opened in 1970. The concrete Brutalist structure—one of the most inventive buildings in that style, with its fan-shaped procession down a spiral of semi-open galleries—was deemed seismically unsafe in 1997, and iron braces were added in 2001 to improve safety. In 1999, the Pacific Film Archive moved to a temporary building across the street.

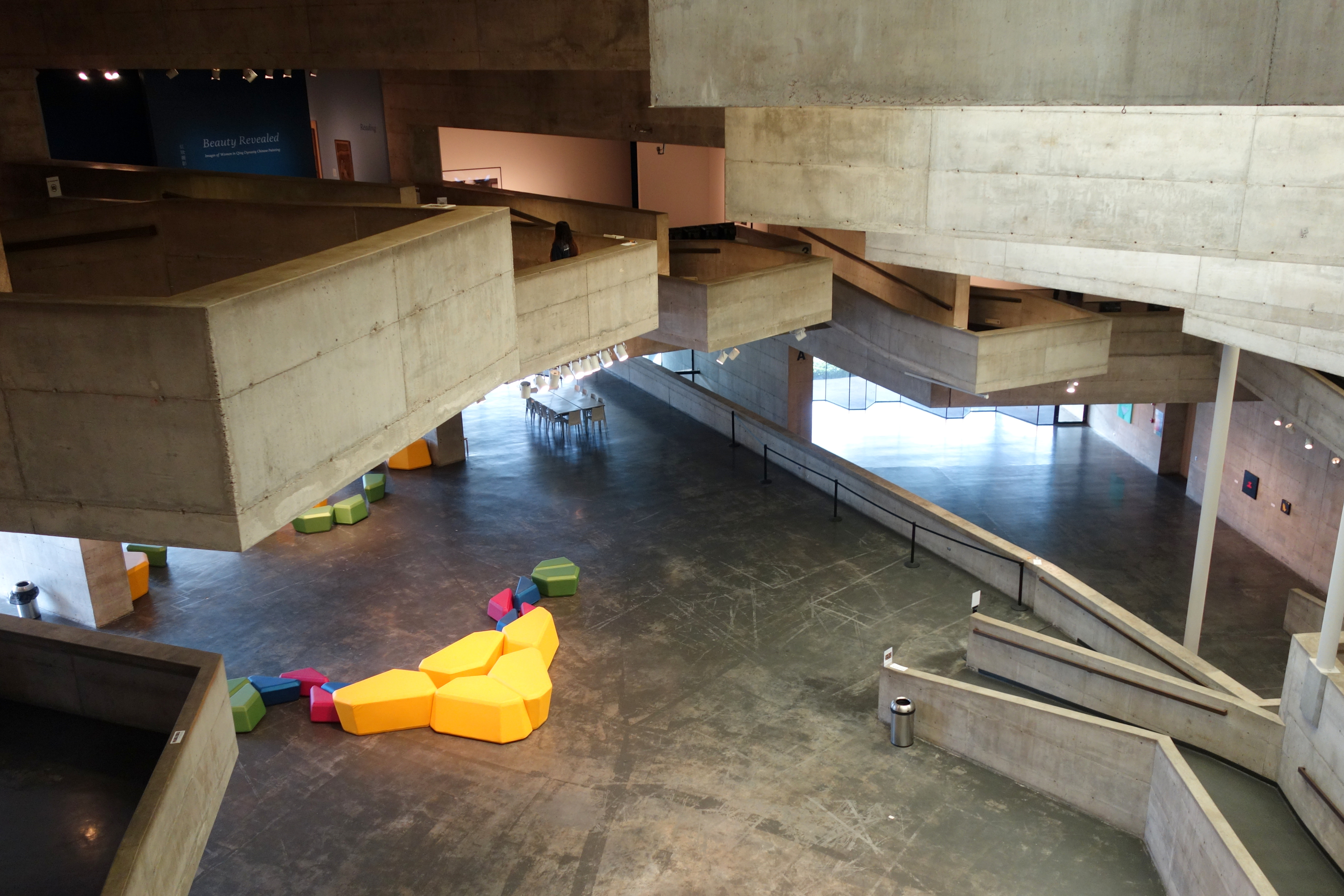
Interior of the former (seismically unsafe) Berkeley Art Museum and Pacific Film Archive building designed by Mario Ciampi.

In 2008, BAMPFA unveiled plans for a new museum building, to be designed by the Japanese architect Toyo Ito and located in downtown Berkeley, across the street from UC Berkeley's main entrance. In 2009 construction of Ito's planned design was cancelled. Citing the weak economy and trouble raising necessary funds, BAMPFA decided to re-construct and enlarge (rather than completely demolish) the former University of California Press printing plant at that site, a 1939 Art Deco building on the California Register of Historic Resources and qualified to be on the National Register of Historic Places because of its role in the publication of the United Nations Charter.

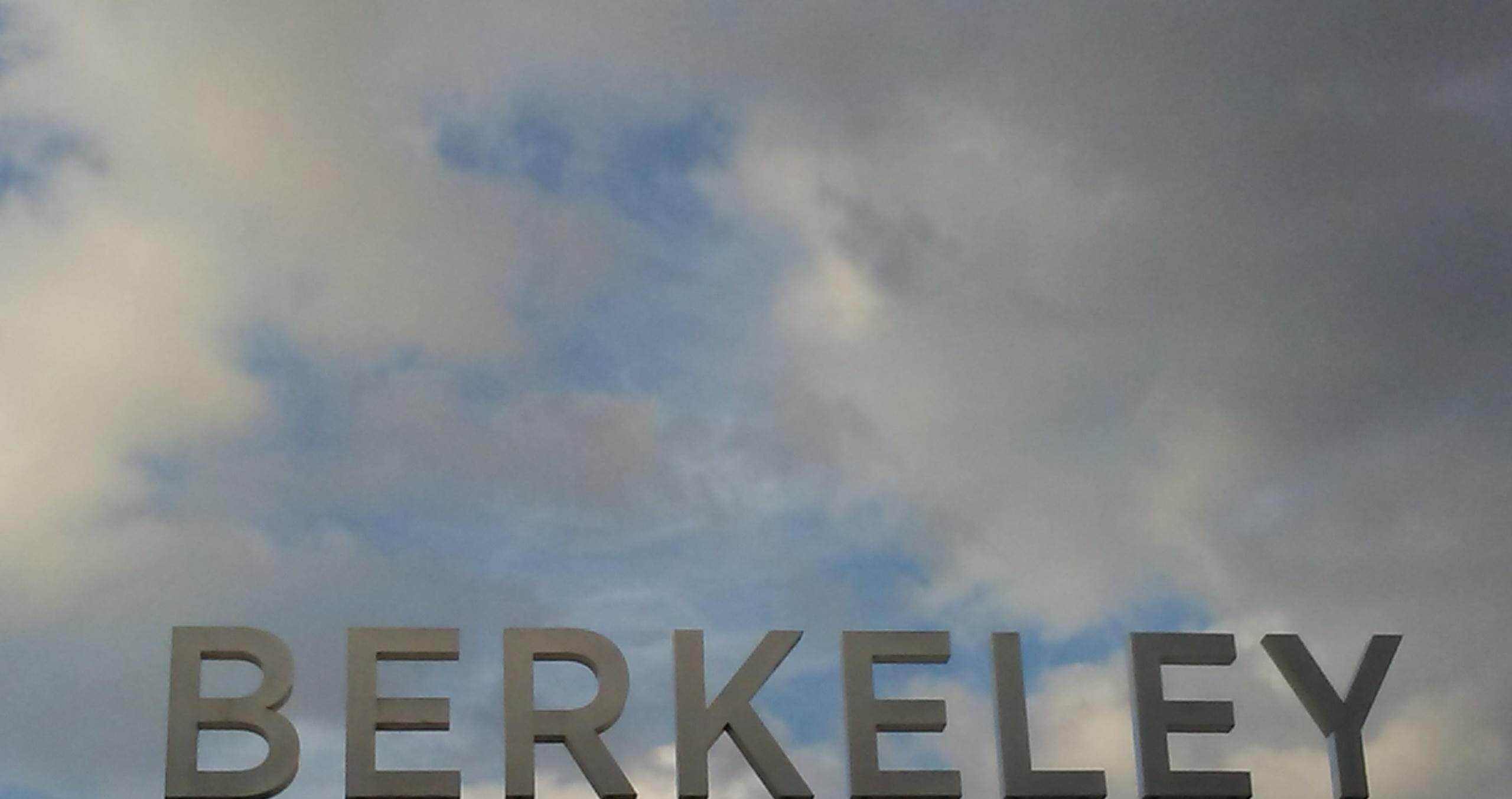
Berkeley Art Museum sign (detail), photo by Steven Saylor.

In 2011, BAMPFA presented the schematic design for the $100 million transformation of the former printing plant into its new home, designed by the New York firm Diller Scofidio + Renfro. Located at 2155 Center Street in downtown Berkeley, the building combines the shell of the pre-existing art deco concrete structure with a new metal-clad, skylighted addition that includes several galleries, a 232-seat theater, a store and a learning center. Construction began in 2013. The museum reopened to the public on January 31, 2016. The building totals 83,000 square feet, with 25,000 square feet of gallery space.

The vacated Mario Ciampi building was added to the National Register of Historic Places in 2014. The building, seismically retrofitted and "reimagined", reopened in late 2021 as the Bakar BioEnginuity Hub, an incubator for biotechnology start-ups, named Woo Hon Fai Hall in honor of the father of a donor, David Woo.

== See also ==
- List of film archives
