= Lawrence Rinder =

American contemporary art curator and museum director

Lawrence R. Rinder is a contemporary art curator and museum director. He directed the Berkeley Art Museum and Pacific Film Archive (BAMPFA) from 2008 to 2020. Since 2014, Rinder has been a board member and advisor of Kadist.

== Education ==
Rinder received a Bachelor of Arts in art from Reed College and a Master of Arts in art history from Hunter College. He has held teaching positions at UC Berkeley, Columbia University, and Deep Springs College.

He was the Dean of the College at California College of the Arts in San Francisco, a position he was appointed to in 2004.

== Career ==
=== Exhibitions ===
Rinder served as the Anne and Joel Ehrenkranz Curator of Contemporary Art at the Whitney Museum of American Art where he organized exhibitions including "The American Effect", "BitStreams", the 2002 Whitney Biennial, and "Tim Hawkinson", which was given the 2005 award for best monographic exhibition in a New York museum by the United States chapter of the International Association of Art Critics. Prior to the Whitney, Rinder was founding director of the CCA Wattis Institute for Contemporary Arts, in San Francisco, and served as Assistant Director and Curator for Twentieth-Century Art at the Berkeley Art Museum and Pacific Film Archive. Among the many exhibitions he organized at these institutions are "Searchlight: Consciousness at the Millennium" (1999), "Knowledge of Higher Worlds: Rudolf Steiner's Blackboard Drawings" (1997), "Louise Bourgeois: Drawings" (1996), "In a Different Light" (1995), "Félix González-Torres" (1994), and "Where There Is Where There: The Prints of John Cage" (1989).

In September 2007, the Judah L. Magnes Museum in Berkeley, California, opened an installation guest curated by Rinder entitled Shahrokh Yadegari: Through Music. This installation served as the latest exhibition in the Museum's REVISIONS series, in which contemporary artists create original installations based on objects in the Museum's extensive collections.

=== Publishing ===
He has published poetry, fiction, and art criticism in Zyzzyva, Fresh Men 2: New Voices in Gay Fiction, Flash Art, Artforum, nest, The Village Voice, Fillip, and Parkett. He is the author of a novel, Revenge of the Decorated Pigs, and a novella (with Colter Jacobsen) "Tuleyome", which was described by Colin Herd in 3:AM Magazine as "Comic and melancholy in equal measure, Tuleyome is the most fully realised example of a text-photo-novel I can think of, where the text and the photos are equal players in the advance of a complex and fascinating narrative, and where the formal properties of both text and photograph are interrogated and laid bare."

Art Life: Selected Writings, 1991-2005, published by Gregory R. Miller and Company in Spring 2006, is his first book of essays. His first play, “The Wishing Well," co-authored with Kevin Killian, premiered in 2006 and was published that year in The Back Room Anthology (Clear Cut Press). In 2003, Rinder was inducted into the National Register of Peer Professionals of the U.S. General Services Administration, and in 2005, he was appointed to the San Francisco Arts Commission by Mayor Gavin Newsom.

=== BAMPFA ===
From 2008 to 2020, Rinder was Director and chief curatior of the Berkeley Art Museum and Pacific Film Archive, where he "organized some of the largest and most ballyhooed exhibitions in recent years." He also oversaw a major move for the museum from its seismically unstable brutalist building to a new building designed by Diller Scofidio + Renfro in downtown Berkeley. Rinder announced his retirement from BAMPFA in September 2019.
