= List of Guggenheim Fellowships awarded in 1986 =

Two hundred and seventy-two scholars, artists, and scientists received Guggenheim Fellowships in 1986. $5,899,000 was disbursed between the recipients, who were chosen from an applicant pool of 3,717 and represented 99 different institutions. University of California, Berkeley and University of Pennsylvania tied for most fellowship recipients on their faculty.

== 1986 United States and Canada fellows ==
Category	Field of Study	Fellow	Institutional association	Research topic	Notes	Ref
Creative Arts	Choreography	Karole Armitage	Armitage Ballet	Choreographing		
Creative Arts	Choreography	Mark W. Morris	Mark Morris Dance Group	Choreographing		
Creative Arts	Drama & Performance Art	Mark O'Donnell		Playwriting		
Creative Arts	Drama & Performance Art	Peter Parnell		Playwriting		
Creative Arts	Drama & Performance Art	Theodora Skipitares		Puppet designing and building for Defenders of the Code		
Creative Arts	Drama & Performance Art	August Wilson		Playwriting		
Creative Arts	Fiction	Max Apple	Rice University	Writing		
Creative Arts	Fiction	Andre Dubus	Bradford College	Writing	Also won in 1976	
Creative Arts	Fiction	Josephine Humphreys		Traveling around the southern United States		
Creative Arts	Fiction	Diana O'Hehir	Mills College	Writing		
Creative Arts	Fiction	David Small	Pennsylvania Medical Society	The River in Winter (published 1987) and Alone (published 1991)		
Creative Arts	Fiction	Niccolò Tucci		Writing		
Creative Arts	Fiction	James Wilcox		Writing		
Creative Arts	Film	James Benning		Filmmaking		
Creative Arts	Film	Paul Glabicki	University of Pittsburgh	Film: Under the Sea		
Creative Arts	Film	Richard Gordon		Filmmaking		
Creative Arts	Film	William Miles		Filmmaking		
Creative Arts	Film	Enrique Oliver		Feature-length film: Lola La Loca		
Creative Arts	Film	Deborah Shaffer		Filmmaking		
Creative Arts	Film	Glenn S. Silber		Filmmaking		
Creative Arts	Film	Al Wong	San Francisco Art Institute	Light and shadow installation		
Creative Arts	Fine Arts	Terry Allen		Visual art		
Creative Arts	Fine Arts	John Baldessari	California Institute of Arts	Visual art		
Creative Arts	Fine Arts	Richard T. Beckett		Painting		
Creative Arts	Fine Arts	Thomas R. Bohnert	Mott Community College	Sculpture		
Creative Arts	Fine Arts	Christopher N. Duncan	Bennington College	Sculpture: Opened a studio in New York		
Creative Arts	Fine Arts	Garth Evans		Sculpture		
Creative Arts	Fine Arts	Bill Fontana		Sound sculpture		
Creative Arts	Fine Arts	Alvin D. Loving	Virginia Commonwealth University (visiting)	Painting		
Creative Arts	Fine Arts	Mary Miss	School of Visual Arts	Sculpture		
Creative Arts	Fine Arts	Gwynn Murrill		Sculpture		
Creative Arts	Fine Arts	Stephen Posen		Painting		
Creative Arts	Fine Arts	David Salle		Painting for the theatre		
Creative Arts	Fine Arts	May Stevens	School of Visual Arts	Painting		
Creative Arts	Fine Arts	Philip Wofford	Bennington College	Painting: Maintained a studio for work in New York City		
Creative Arts	Music Composition	Daniel Asia	Oberlin College	Writing music, studying scores, and conducting		
Creative Arts	Music Composition	Eric Chasalow		Composing		
Creative Arts	Music Composition	Michelle Ekizian	Columbia University	Orchestral music		
Creative Arts	Music Composition	Jean Eichelberger Ivey	Peabody Conservatory of Music	Composing		
Creative Arts	Music Composition	Thomas Oboe Lee		Composing	Also won in 1983	
Creative Arts	Music Composition	Glenn Lieberman	Manhattan School of Music	Composing		
Creative Arts	Music Composition	Steven Stucky	Cornell University	Composing		
Creative Arts	Music Composition	John H. Thow	UC Berkeley	Composing		
Creative Arts	Music Composition	Walter Keith Winslow	Reed College (visiting)	Multitrack recording technique		
Creative Arts	Photography	Richard M. A. Benson	Yale University		Also won in 1978	
Creative Arts	Photography	Judith B. Black	Brandeis University	Took a cross-country trip across the US with her family		
Creative Arts	Photography	Jed Devine	SUNY Purchase	Two limited edition books of his photography		
Creative Arts	Photography	John Divola	California Institute of Arts			
Creative Arts	Photography	Frank P. Herrera		Cross Reference, "the landscape of West Virginia within the context of a cluster of three crosses erected throughout the East Coast"		
Creative Arts	Photography	Nicholas Nixon	Massachusetts College of Art		Also won in 1976	
Creative Arts	Photography	Art Rogers		West Marin people and places		
Creative Arts	Photography	JoAnn Verburg				
Creative Arts	Poetry	Alfred Corn	Yale University (visiting)	Writing		
Creative Arts	Poetry	Alice Fulton	University of Michigan	Writing		
Creative Arts	Poetry	Denis Hale Johnson		Writing		
Creative Arts	Poetry	Ann Lauterbach		Writing		
Creative Arts	Poetry	Wesley McNair	Colby-Sawyer College	Adding new poems to The Town of No and working on a third volume of poetry		
Creative Arts	Poetry	John Frederick Nims	University of Illinois, Chicago	Writing		
Creative Arts	Poetry	Ron Padgett		Writing		
Creative Arts	Poetry	Gjertrud Schnackenberg		Writing		
Creative Arts	Poetry	Vikram Seth	Stanford University	Novel in prose set in India		
Creative Arts	Poetry	Tom Sleigh	Dartmouth University (visiting)	Writing		
Creative Arts	Poetry	Theodore R. Weiss	Princeton University	Writing		
Creative Arts	Video & Audio	Gary Hill	Cornish College of the Arts		Also won in 1990	
Creative Arts	Video & Audio	Bill Stephens				
Humanities	American Literature	Richard H. Brodhead	Yale University	Fiction and family life in 19th-century America		
Humanities	American Literature	Cathy N. Davidson	Michigan State University			
Humanities	American Literature	Timothy Materer	University of Missouri-Columbia	Correspondence between Ezra Pound and John Quinn		
Humanities	American Literature	Janice A. Radway	University of Pennsylvania			
Humanities	American Literature	Alan Wilde	Temple University	Middle Grounds: Studies on Contemporary American Fiction		
Humanities	Architecture, Planning, & Design	W. John Archer	University of Minnesota	Romantic suburb in Britain and America before 1870		
Humanities	Architecture, Planning, & Design	Peter C. Papademetriou	Rice University	Eero Saarinen		
Humanities	Architecture, Planning, & Design	Michael B. Teitz	UC Berkeley			
Humanities	Bibliography	J. M. Edelstein	National Gallery of Art	Bibliography of the Cummington Press and Abattoir Editions		
Humanities	Biography	Elisabeth Young-Bruehl	Wesleyan University	Anna Freud		
Humanities	British History	John W. Cell	Duke University	Biography of Malcolm Hailey		
Humanities	British History	Janet Oppenheim	American University			
Humanities	Classics	Alan Cameron	Columbia University	Last pagans of Rome		
Humanities	Classics	Richard C. M. Janko	Columbia University	Commentary on the Iliad, books 13-16		
Humanities	Classics	Anthony A. Long	UC Berkeley			
Humanities	Classics	Robert H. Rodgers	University of Vermont (visiting)	Aqueducts of ancient Rome		
Humanities	Dance Studies	Suzanne Shelton Buckley	University of Texas at Austin	American perspective of Indian dance		
Humanities	East Asian Studies	Paul A. Cohen	Wellesley College			
Humanities	East Asian Studies	Stephen Owen	Harvard University			
Humanities	East Asian Studies	Jeffrey K. Riegel	UC Berkeley			
Humanities	East Asian Studies	William T. Rowe	Johns Hopkins University	The career of Chen Hongmou		
Humanities	Economic History	Jan S. Hogendorn	Colby College	Slavery and indigenous money in colonial Nigeria		
Humanities	Economic History	James C. Riley	Indiana University-Bloomington	History of sickness and the timing of death		
Humanities	English Literature	George Bornstein	University of Michigan	Edition of Yeats' early poetic manuscripts		
Humanities	English Literature	Sanford Budick	Hebrew University			
Humanities	English Literature	Dustin H. Griffin	New York University	Satire		
Humanities	English Literature	William Kerrigan	University of Maryland			
Humanities	English Literature	Marjorie B. Levinson	University of Pennsylvania			
Humanities	English Literature	Leah S. Marcus	University of Wisconsin-Madison			
Humanities	English Literature	Edward Mendelson	Columbia University	Later life and works of W. H. Auden		
Humanities	English Literature	Morton D. Paley	UC Berkeley		Also won in 1972	
Humanities	English Literature	Daphne Patai	University of Massachusetts at Amherst	Katherine Burdekin		
Humanities	English Literature	Robert Pattison	Long Island University	Revaluation of John Henry Newman		
Humanities	English Literature	Ronald H. Paulson	Johns Hopkins University	Memorial, or funeral, images in 18th-century English art and literature	Also won in 1965	
Humanities	Film, Video, & Radio Studies	Robert Stam	New York University	Evolving treatment of Black characters and themes in the Brazilian cinema		
Humanities	Fine Arts Research	Petra T. Chu	Seton Hall University	Critical edition of the letters of Gustave Courbet		
Humanities	Fine Arts Research	Joseph Connors	Columbia University	Architecture of Francesco Borromini		
Humanities	Fine Arts Research	Charlotte Douglas	Hunter College	Comprehensive overview of Russian art, 1880-1930		
Humanities	Fine Arts Research	Rona Goffen	Duke University	Giovanni Bellini and the Renaissance in Venice		
Humanities	Folklore & Popular Culture	Gary Giddins	Village Voice and New York University	Critical history of recorded jazz		
Humanities	Folklore & Popular Culture	John T. Kirk	Boston University	Relationship of American art and artifact		
Humanities	Folklore & Popular Culture	Barbara Kirshenblatt-Gimblett	New York University	Formation of vernacular culture in New York City		
Humanities	Folklore & Popular Culture	Susan A. Stewart	Temple University	Relationship between folklore and literature		
Humanities	French History	Jonathan S. Dewald	University of California			
Humanities	French History	Timothy Tackett	Catholic University of America			
Humanities	French Literature	Frank Paul Bowman	University of Pennsylvania		Also won in 1968	
Humanities	French Literature	Joan E. DeJean	Princeton University	17th-century French women writers and the development of the modern novel		
Humanities	French Literature	Suzanne Nash	Princeton University	Representation of Germany in French travel literature, 1800-1848		
Humanities	French Literature	Glyn P. Norton	Pennsylvania State University	Theory and art of extemporaneity in the French Renaissance text		
Humanities	French Literature	Richard Pevear		Translation of works by Yves Bonnefoy		
Humanities	General Nonfiction	Sally Belfrage				
Humanities	General Nonfiction	Susan Jacoby		Uses of failure and adversity in the culture of success		
Humanities	General Nonfiction	Joe Klein		Fundamentalist religion and sexual mores in a small American town		
Humanities	General Nonfiction	Robert L. Kuttner				
Humanities	General Nonfiction	Lawrence Weschler	The New Yorker	Rehabilitation of torture victims		
Humanities	German & East European History	Yaffa Eliach	Brooklyn College	Shtetl of Eišiškės, 1070-1944		
Humanities	German & East European History	Ronnie Po-chia Hsia	Cornell University	Origins anti-Semitism in early modern Germany		
Humanities	German & Scandinavian Literature	James A. Schultz	Yale University	Childhood and youth in German narrative, 1150-1350		
Humanities	History of Science & Technology	Thomas P. Hughes	University of Pennsylvania			
Humanities	Iberian & Latin American History	Laird W. Bergad	Lehman College	Socioeconomic history of Cuban rural society in 19th-century Matanzas		
Humanities	Iberian & Latin American History	John H. Coatsworth	University of Chicago			
Humanities	Iberian & Latin American History	Nancy Leys Stepan	Columbia University	Latin America and the world eugenics movement		
Humanities	Intellectual & Cultural History	Joel Kovel	Albert Einstein College of Medicine	Critique of spirituality		
Humanities	Italian Literature	Tibor I. Wlassics	University of Virginia	Relationship between Galileo and the Inquisition		
Humanities	Latin American Literature	Sylvia Molloy	Princeton University	Spanish-American autobiographical writing of the 19th and 20th centuries		
Humanities	Linguistics	John Algeo	University of Georgia	Differences in British and American grammar		
Humanities	Linguistics	Robin H. Cooper	University of Wisconsin-Madison			
Humanities	Linguistics	Gillian Sankoff	University of Pennsylvania			
Humanities	Literary Criticism	David L. Bromwich	Princeton University	Modernism and modernity in English poetry		
Humanities	Literary Criticism	Geoffrey H. Hartman	Yale University	Poetical character	Also won in 1969	
Humanities	Literary Criticism	David L. Quint	Princeton University	Epic poetry and the political ideology of imperialism		
Humanities	Medieval History	Karl F. Morrison	University of Kansas			
Humanities	Medieval History	Charles T. Wood	Dartmouth College	King Arthur and the destiny of England in the 12th through 16th centuries		
Humanities	Medieval Literature	John A. Alford	Michigan State University			
Humanities	Medieval Literature	Stephen A. Barney	UC Irvine			
Humanities	Medieval Literature	Jan M. Ziolkowski	Harvard University			
Humanities	Music Research	Edward H. Roesner	New York University	Critical edition of the Parisian organum tripla and quadrupla		
Humanities	Music Research	Richard F. Taruskin	Columbia University	Stravinsky's "Russian" period		
Humanities	Philosophy	Sarah Broadie	University of Texas at Austin	Aristotle's Ethics		
Humanities	Philosophy	Daniel C. Dennett	Tufts University	Human consciousness		
Humanities	Philosophy	Ellery Thomas Eells	University of Wisconsin-Madison			
Humanities	Philosophy	Charles D. Parsons	Columbia University	Philosophy of mathematics		
Humanities	Philosophy	Judith Jarvis Thomson	Massachusetts Institute of Technology			
Humanities	Photography Studies	Allan Sekula	California Institute of Arts	Relationship between instrumental realism and photographic modernism		
Humanities	Religion	Adele Berlin	University of Maryland	Unity and meaning in classical Hebrew poetry		
Humanities	Renaissance History	Judith C. Brown	Stanford University			
Humanities	Russian History	Katerina Clark	Indiana University	Intellectual life of Petersburg/Petrograd/Leningrad, 1913-1931		
Humanities	Russian History	John P. LeDonne	Harvard University			
Humanities	Science Writing	John W. Birks	University of Colorado			
Humanities	Science Writing	Timothy Ferris	University of Southern California			
Humanities	Slavic Literature	Gerald Stanton Smith				
Humanities	South Asian Studies	Diana L. Eck	Harvard University			
Humanities	South Asian Studies	Richard Salomon	University of Washington	Ancient Sanskrit inscriptions		
Humanities	Spanish & Portuguese Literature	Alban Forcione	Princeton University	Perspectives on the literature of the European baroque		
Humanities	Spanish & Portuguese Literature	Germán Gullón	University of Pennsylvania	Research in Spain for La novela moderna en España (published 1992)		
Humanities	Spanish & Portuguese Literature	Susan Kirkpatrick	UC San Diego	Spanish women writers		
Humanities	Theatre Arts	Peter Schumann	Bread and Puppet Theatre	Potentials of puppetry		
Humanities	Theatre Arts	Jennifer Tipton	Yale University	Book on theatrical lighting design		
Humanities	United States History	James Chace	The New York Times Book Review	Nature of American national security, 1812-present		
Humanities	United States History	Drew Gilpin Faust	University of Pennsylvania			
Humanities	United States History	John Lewis Gaddis	Ohio University	Interpretive history of American foreign relations		
Humanities	United States History	David C. Hammack	Case Western Reserve University	Role of national institutions in New York City's 20th-century fiscal crises		
Humanities	United States History	Thomas L. Haskell	Rice University	Reform and moral responsibility in Anglo-American culture, 1700-1900		
Humanities	United States History	James E. Hoopes	Babson College	Consciousness in New England (published 1989)		
Humanities	United States History	David Levering Lewis	Rutgers University	W. E. B. Du Bois		
Humanities	United States History	David McCullough				
Humanities	United States History	Olivier Zunz	University of Virginia	Social contours of corporate America, 1870-1920		
Natural Sciences	Applied Mathematics	Mark H. Holmes	Rensselaer Polytechnic Institute	Mathematical modeling of mechanoreceptorss		
Natural Sciences	Applied Mathematics	W. Kendall Melville	Massachusetts Institute of Technology	Ocean waves		
Natural Sciences	Applied Mathematics	Henry M. Van Driel	University of Toronto			
Natural Sciences	Applied Mathematics	Julia R. Weertman	Northwestern University			
Natural Sciences	Astronomy & Atrophysics	Ann Merchant Boesgaard	University of Hawaii	Basic cause for the change in a star's lithium content		
Natural Sciences	Astronomy & Atrophysics	Don N. Page	Pennsylvania State University	Research at the California Institute of Technology and University of Texas, Austin		
Natural Sciences	Chemistry	Harry R. Allcock	Pennsylvania State University	Use of synthetic polymers as semiconductors, catalysts, and biomedical materials		
Natural Sciences	Chemistry	Rodney J. Bartlett	University of Florida	Research at Harvard University		
Natural Sciences	Chemistry	Barry K. Carpenter	Cornell University	Challenges to the classical models of reactivity		
Natural Sciences	Chemistry	Charles H. DePuy	University of Colorado		Also won in 1977	
Natural Sciences	Chemistry	Graham R. Fleming	University of Chicago			
Natural Sciences	Chemistry	Keith E. Gubbins	Cornell University	Statistical mechanics of small systems		
Natural Sciences	Chemistry	Paul L. Houston	Cornell University	Molecular dynamics of elementary chemical processes		
Natural Sciences	Chemistry	Joel E. Keizer	UC Davis			
Natural Sciences	Chemistry	Anthony J. Merer	University of British Columbia			
Natural Sciences	Chemistry	Martin Moskovits	University of Toronto	Research at UC Berkeley		
Natural Sciences	Chemistry	Ei-ichi Negishi	Purdue University			
Natural Sciences	Chemistry	William B. Walters	University of Maryland at College Park	Radioactive decay of oriented nuclei		
Natural Sciences	Chemistry	Peter G. Wolynes	University of Illinois at Urbana-Champaign	Disorder physics and the chemistry of liquids and biomolecules		
Natural Sciences	Computer Science	Jill H. Larkin	Carnegie Mellon University			
Natural Sciences	Computer Science	Jeffrey S. Vitter	Mathematical Sciences Research Institute (visiting)	Mathematical analysis of algorithms and computational complexity		
Natural Sciences	Earth Science	Murli H. Manghnani	University of Hawaii	Ultra-high pressure and temperature studies in mineral physics		
Natural Sciences	Earth Science	William Richard Peltier	University of Toronto			
Natural Sciences	Engineering	Matthew Tirrell	University of Minnesota			
Natural Sciences	Mathematics	Solomon Feferman	Stanford University	Theory of formal systems for mathematics; also, editorial work on Kurt Gödel's Nachlass	Also won in 1972	
Natural Sciences	Mathematics	Harvey M. Friedman	Ohio State University	Foundations of mathematics		
Natural Sciences	Mathematics	Vaughan F.R. Jones	UC Berkeley	Algebra, analysis, and topology		
Natural Sciences	Mathematics	Victor Kac	Massachusetts Institute of Technology	Representation theory		
Natural Sciences	Mathematics	Carlos E. Kenig	University of Chicago	Harmonic analysis and partial differential equations		
Natural Sciences	Medicine & Health	Gerald S. Lazarus	University of Pennsylvania			
Natural Sciences	Medicine & Health	Robert W. Schrier	University of Colorado School of Medicine			
Natural Sciences	Medicine & Health	Robert B. Zurier	University of Pennsylvania	Research at Imperial Cancer Research Lab in London		
Natural Sciences	Molecular & Cellular Biology	Giuseppe Attardi	California Institute of Technology	Mitochondria	Also won in 1970	
Natural Sciences	Molecular & Cellular Biology	Neal C. Brown	University of Massachusetts Medical School			
Natural Sciences	Molecular & Cellular Biology	Wah Chiu	University of Arizona	Proteins, DNA complex, and animal viruses		
Natural Sciences	Molecular & Cellular Biology	John G. Forte	UC Berkeley			
Natural Sciences	Molecular & Cellular Biology	Lila M. Gierasch	University of Delaware	Biophysical studies of protein export		
Natural Sciences	Molecular & Cellular Biology	Leonard A. Herzenberg	Stanford University		Also won in 1976	
Natural Sciences	Molecular & Cellular Biology	Jonathan King	Massachusetts Institute of Technology			
Natural Sciences	Molecular & Cellular Biology	Anne O. Summers	University of Georgia	Research at Massachusetts Institute of Technology		
Natural Sciences	Molecular & Cellular Biology	James C. Wang	Harvard University			
Natural Sciences	Molecular & Cellular Biology	Christopher C. Widnell	University of Pittsburgh School of Medicine	Regulation of membrane flow		
Natural Sciences	Neuroscience	Alan D. Grinnell	UCLA			
Natural Sciences	Neuroscience	Ronald M. Harris-Warrick	Cornell University	Neuromodulation of a small motor circuit		
Natural Sciences	Neuroscience	Philip A. Schwartzkroin	University of Washington			
Natural Sciences	Organismic Biology & Ecology	Pere Alberch	Harvard University			
Natural Sciences	Organismic Biology & Ecology	Diane W. Davidson	University of Utah			
Natural Sciences	Organismic Biology & Ecology	David W. Deamer	UC Davis	Murchison meteorite		
Natural Sciences	Organismic Biology & Ecology	Thomas C. Emmel	University of Florida			
Natural Sciences	Organismic Biology & Ecology	Robert L. Jeanne	University of Wisconsin-Madison			
Natural Sciences	Organismic Biology & Ecology	Andrew H. Knoll	Harvard University			
Natural Sciences	Organismic Biology & Ecology	James W. Truman	University of Washington			
Natural Sciences	Organismic Biology & Ecology	Michael Turelli	UC Davis	Research at University College London		
Natural Sciences	Organismic Biology & Ecology	David Sloan Wilson	Michigan State University	How people arrive at their beliefs about other people and events		
Natural Sciences	Physics	Elihu Abrahams	Rutgers University	Condensed matter physics		
Natural Sciences	Physics	James D. Callen	University of Wisconsin-Madison			
Natural Sciences	Physics	Moses H. W. Chan	Pennsylvania State University	Thermodynamic and structural experiments of systems in reduced dimensionality		
Natural Sciences	Physics	John C. Collins	Illinois Institute of Technology			
Natural Sciences	Physics	Albert E. Litherland	University of Toronto			
Natural Sciences	Physics	Stephen L. Olsen	University of Rochester	Elementary particle physics		
Natural Sciences	Physics	Richard G. Palmer	Duke University	Stained glass, neural networks, optimization, and relaxation and reaction in complex systems		
Natural Sciences	Physics	E. Ward Plummer	University of Pennsylvania			
Natural Sciences	Physics	Charles B. Thorn III	University of Florida			
Natural Sciences	Plant Sciences	Mary Helen Goldsmith	Yale University	Regulation of ion channels in plant cell membranes		
Natural Sciences	Plant Sciences	Mark Jacobs	Swarthmore College			
Natural Sciences	Plant Sciences	Virginia Walbot	Stanford University			
Natural Sciences	Statistics	David A. Lane	University of Minnesota			
Natural Sciences	Statistics	Wing Hung Wong	University of Chicago			
Social Sciences	Anthropology & Cultural Studies	David I. Kertzer	Bowdoin College	The complex family households system in the countryside outside Bologna		
Social Sciences	Anthropology & Cultural Studies	David Maybury-Lewis	Harvard University			
Social Sciences	Anthropology & Cultural Studies	Abraham Rosman	Barnard College	Trade networks in New Ireland	With Paula G. Rubel	
Social Sciences	Anthropology & Cultural Studies	Paula G. Rubel	Barnard College	Trade networks in New Ireland	With Abraham Rosman	
Social Sciences	Anthropology & Cultural Studies	Nancy Scheper-Hughes	UC Berkeley			
Social Sciences	Anthropology & Cultural Studies	M. G. Trend	Auburn University	What it meant to grow up as a child of an independent Southern Black farmer in the 1940s and 1950s		
Social Sciences	Anthropology & Cultural Studies	Alan C. Walker	Johns Hopkins University			
Social Sciences	Economics	Peter J. Hammond	Stanford University			
Social Sciences	Economics	Nicholas M. Kiefer	Cornell University	Applied stochastic economics		
Social Sciences	Economics	Frank Levy	University of Maryland	Research at Brookings Institution		
Social Sciences	Economics	Paul R. Milgrom	Yale University	Economic theories of organization		
Social Sciences	Economics	Janet Louise Yellen	UC Berkeley			
Social Sciences	Geography & Environmental Studies	Peirce F. Lewis	Pennsylvania State University	Library and field research on the physical and cultural landscapes of the US at UC Berkeley and the University of Cambridge		
Social Sciences	Geography & Environmental Studies	Allen J. Scott	UCLA			
Social Sciences	Law	George P. Fletcher	Columbia University School of Law	Kantian legal theory		
Social Sciences	Law	R. H. Helmholz	University of Chicago			
Social Sciences	Political Science	Steven J. Brams	New York University	Game theory and national security		
Social Sciences	Political Science	Walter D. Connor	Boston University	Soviet working class in the post-Stalin era		
Social Sciences	Political Science	Edward Friedman	University of Wisconsin-Madison	Maoist socialism and the Leninist state		
Social Sciences	Political Science	Gene I. Rochlin	UC Berkeley			
Social Sciences	Political Science	Philippa Strum	Brooklyn College and Graduate Center CUNY	Civil liberties in Israel		
Social Sciences	Psychology	Lynn Hasher	Temple University	How people acquire and use knowledge about spatial relationships		
Social Sciences	Psychology	George A. Miller	Princeton University	Organization of lexical memory		
Social Sciences	Psychology	Melvin R. Novick	University of Iowa	Commentaries on psychological testing	Unused; died May 20, 1986	
Social Sciences	Psychology	Judith Rodin	Yale University	Causes and consequences of the increasing concern with body image		
Social Sciences	Psychology	Paul Slovic	University of Oregon	Why civilian leaders pursue the arms race and what information would help motivate action toward reducing the threat of nuclear war		
Social Sciences	Sociology	Paul D. Allison	University of Pennsylvania	Estimation of linear models with incomplete data		
Social Sciences	Sociology	David L. Featherman	University of Wisconsin-Madison	Models of development and aging across the lifespan		
Social Sciences	Sociology	James S. House	University of Michigan	Social structure, social support, and health		
Social Sciences	Sociology	William M. Mason	University of Michigan	Comparative analysis of human fertility		
Social Sciences	Sociology	Mark Traugott	UC Santa Cruz	Barricades as a form of revolutionary culture		

== 1986 Latin American and Caribbean Fellows ==
Category	Field of Study	Fellow	Institutional association	Research topic	Notes	Ref
Creative Arts	Fiction	Alicia Dujovne Ortiz		Writing		
Creative Arts	Fiction	Juan Carlos Martini		Writing		
Creative Arts	Fiction	Edgardo Rodríguez Juliá	Universidad de Puerto Rico	Writing		
Creative Arts	Film	Juan Roberto Mora Catlett	Instituto Latinoamericano de la Comunicación Educativa and Centro de Capacitación Cinematográfica	Return to Aztlán (1990)		
Creative Arts	Fine Arts	Carlos Gorriarena		Painting		
Creative Arts	Fine Arts	Irma Palacios Flores		Painting		
Creative Arts	Photography	Paz Errázuriz		Boxeadores. El Combate Contra el Ángel		
Creative Arts	Poetry	Rafael Cadenas	Universidad Central de Venezuela	Writing		
Humanities	Film, Video, & Radio Studies	Heloisa Buarque de Hollanda	Universidade Federal do Rio de Janeiro			
Humanities	Fine Arts Research	Alberto Pérez	Universidad Central and Universidad de Chile			
Humanities	Iberian & Latin American History	Juan Carlos Garavaglia				
Humanities	Iberian & Latin American History	Raúl Jacob	Universidad de la Republica			
Humanities	Latin American Literature	Alfredo Bosi	Universidade de São Paulo			
Humanities	Music Research	Mario Milanca Guzmán		Research on Teresa Carreño		
Humanities	Music Research	Marlui Miranda	Universidade de São Paulo			
Natural Sciences	Mathematics	Victor Jaime Yohai	Universidad de Buenos Aires			
Natural Sciences	Medicine & Health	Mario Alberto Pisarev	Comision Nacional de Energia Atomica	Research at the NIH		
Natural Sciences	Molecular & Cellular Biology	Leopoldo de Meis	Universidade Federal do Rio de Janeiro			
Natural Sciences	Molecular & Cellular Biology	Francisco Rothhammer	Universidad de Chile			
Natural Sciences	Neuroscience	Fernando Morgan de A Correa	Universidade de São Paulo			
Natural Sciences	Physical Sciences	Oswaldo Baffa-Filho	Universidade de São Paulo	Postdoc at University of Wisconsin-Madison		
Natural Sciences	Physics	Hans J. Herrmann	CEA Paris-Saclay and French National Centre for Scientific Research	Origin of life		
Natural Sciences	Physics	Andrés Kálnay	Instituto Venezolano de Investigaciones Científicas			
Natural Sciences	Physics	Guy F. J. de Téramond	Universidad de Costa Rica			
Natural Sciences	Plant Science	Luis Eduardo Luna	Swedish School of Economics and Business Administration	Ethnobotany and ethnomedicine of the Colombian and Peruvian Amazon		
Natural Sciences	Plant Science	Ernesto A. Medina	Instituto Venezolano de Investigaciones Científicas			
Social Sciences	Anthropology & Cultural Studies	Angel J. García Zambrano	Universidad de los Andes			
Social Sciences	Political Science	Oscar Oszlak	Centro de Estudios de Estado y Sociedad			
Social Sciences	Sociology	Andrés Guerrero	Latin American Council of Social Sciences			

== See also ==
- Guggenheim Fellowship
- List of Guggenheim Fellowships awarded in 1985
- List of Guggenheim Fellowships awarded in 1987
