= La hora marcada =

1988 Mexican TV series

- Created by: Carmen Armendáriz
- Country of origin: Mexico

Production
- Running time: 30 minutes

La hora marcada (Spanish pronunciation: [la ˈoɾa maɾˈkaða]) is a 1988 Mexican television anthology series presenting horror and science fiction in the vein of The Twilight Zone, originally aired from 1988 to 1990 by Canal de las Estrellas, with half-hour episodes, and re-broadcast from 1997 to 1999 at various times by Channel 9 (Mexico) and local Televisa channels. Although virtually unknown outside Mexico, it achieved a popular and critical success in that region. The series was the first opportunity for many Mexican filmmakers to venture into the genre of horror, and its rotating cast of writers and directors included Emmanuel Lubezki, Guillermo del Toro and Alfonso Cuarón.

== Characters ==
The "Woman in Black" (La Dama De Negro), who typically makes cameo appearances wearing a long dress and a black veil in the background near the middle or end of many episodes, and sometimes plays a more active role in the episode, is a personification of Death. She was played by several actresses; among the most frequent: Frances Ondiviela, Margot Buzali, and Tere Hernandez.

In the 2007 spin-off series 13 Miedos ("Thirteen Fears"), this character is replaced by a similar character played by Constantino Morán, as a male narrator or horror host with black eyes without pupils, dressed in black, and portrayed as the devil.

== Episodes ==
No. overall	No. in season	Title	Directed by	Teleplay by	Original release date
TBA	TBA	"Concierto para mano izquierda" "Concert for a Left Hand"	Ximena Cuevas	Hugo Macías Macotela	1988
About a phantom hand.
TBA	TBA	"El reloj pt. I & II" "The Clock parts 1 & 2"	Juan Mora Catlett	TBA	TBA
About a ghost haunting a clock.
TBA	TBA	"A veces regresan" "Sometimes They Come Back"	Alfonso Cuarón	Story by : Stephen King (short story); Teleplay by : Alfonso Cuarón and Carlos Cuarón	1989
Two children who explore an abandoned theme park are killed by a gang of bullies, and their spirits return 25 years later for vengeance.
TBA	TBA	"El Jorgito azucarado" "Sweet Little Georgie"	TBA	TBA	TBA
About a boy who practices incest with his brother.
TBA	TBA	"Asilo para jóvenes" "Youth Asylum"	TBD	TBD	1990
About a gypsy who acquires the "eternal youth" of deceived young women.
TBA	TBA	"Caminos de ayer" "Roads of Yesterday"	Guillermo del Toro	Guillermo del Toro	1988
About a time machine and colonial beings.
TBA	TBA	"La visita" "The Visit"	TBD	TBD	1988
About a ghostly nun.
TBA	TBA	"Andrea" "Andrea"	TBA	TBA	TBA
About rituals.
TBA	TBA	"Con todo para llevar / Hamberguesas" "With Everything And To Go / Hamburgers"	Guillermo del Toro	Guillermo del Toro	1989
About a cult of zombies in a fast food restaurant.
TBA	TBA	"De ogros" "Of Ogres"	Alfonso Cuarón	Alfonso Cuarón	1990
About ogres and a little girl.
TBA	TBA	"Fotocelo" "Flashbulb"	TBA	TBA	TBA
About a man who receives pictures of his girlfriend appearing to be unfaithful, causing him to take justice into his own hands.
TBA	TBA	"Juego terminado" "Game Over"	TBA	TBA	TBA
About a child killer and childhood trauma.
TBA	TBA	"El motel" "The Motel"	Luis Estrada	Luis Estrada	1989
A woman and her alcoholic husband are lost on the road. The only place they find to stay overnight is an old and messy motel. Soon the woman will have to manage by herself when her husband disappears and a disturbed murderer begins to stalk her in one place. And worse, even if the woman ends the life of this murderer, will never end with the nightmare.
TBA	TBA	"De ángeles y demonios" "Of Angels and Demons"	Juan Mora Catlett	TBA	TBA
About two people who are supposed to be an angel and a demon.
TBA	TBA	"El doctor Elias y la Muerte" "Doctor Elias and Death"	Juan Mora Catlett	TBD	1990
Dr. Elias is a famous doctor who wants to discover something that makes him famous and makes him a millionaire. When he does not get it easily, he decides to make a pact with Death: if he sees Death near a patient, the doctor can decide whether or not Death can take the patient. Death accepts the agreement and Dr. Elias becomes famous, but people categorize this fame as a doctor who made a pact with the devil. One night in his office, Death visits Dr. Elias to "take him". He defends himself by saying that Death needs his authorization to take him, but she reminds him that the wording of the pact requires Dr. Elias to see Death, and begins setting traps that "invisible Death" will set to end his life. Dr. Elias manages to catch Death; after Dr. Elias dies, the trapped Death can not take anyone in the world, crowding the world with the undying...
TBA	TBA	"El café del fin del mundo" "The Café at the End of the World"	Juan Mora Catlett	TBD	1989
About an after-death experience and the afterlife.
TBA	TBA	"El dinosaurio" "The Dinosaur"	TBD	TBD	1989
A boy is tormented by nightmares where a ferocious dinosaur tries to attack him. His older brother, Pancho, takes advantage of the situation to frighten his brother. Juan tires of this torment, and decides to make a pact with Death so that the dinosaur he fears so much in his dreams comes to life and attacks his older brother, regardless of the horrible consequences.
TBA	TBA	"El espejo enamorado" "The Enamoured Mirror"	TBD	TBD	1990
A mirror that manifests at night as a ghost.
TBA	TBA	"El revólver" "The Revolver"	Juan Mora Catlett	TBD	1990
About a revolver and reincarnation.
TBA	TBA	"El taxi" "The Taxi"	Juan Mora Catlett	TBD	1990
About beasts and death.
TBA	TBA	"En espera de la noche" "Waiting for the Night"	Alejandro Macias	Story by : Alejandro Macias; Teleplay by : Alejandro Macias	1990
While their parents are on vacation two young boys witness the arrival next door of a mysterious old woman and a young woman who only appears at night.
TBA	TBA	"Música de medianoche" "Music at Midnight"	TBD	TBD	1989
About ghostly music.
TBA	TBA	"Equivocación" "Mistake"	TBA	TBA	TBA
A man starts thinking that a man he is dealing with might be the devil and he is willing to strike a deal, no mater what.
TBA	TBA	"No estoy jugando" "I'm Not Playing"	Alfonso Cuarón	Alfonso Cuarón and Carlos Cuarón	1989
A tale of possession in which a spirit tries to force the object of his affection to kill herself so they can be together forever.
TBA	TBA	"Hasta que la muerte nos separe" "Until Death Do Us Part"	TBD	TBD	1986
A man revives his wife after she dies, but not in the condition he hoped for.
TBA	TBA	"Invasión" "Invasion"	Guillermo del Toro	Guillermo del Toro	1988
About extraterrestrials.
TBA	TBA	"Juegos de vídeo" "Video Games"	Juan Mora Catlett	TBA	TBA
Death makes two brothers obsessed with video games test their skills by submitting them to a game of "The Marked Hour", in which one brother is trapped in the game and the other brother must play and win the game to be considered the best player; the brothers are unaware that winning the game is just the beginning of their nightmare...
TBA	TBA	"La bruja tuvo la culpa" "The Witch Is to Blame"	Juan Mora Catlett	TBD	1990
About a witch and spells.
TBA	TBA	"El cultivo" "The Cultivation"	TBD	TBD	1990
About a strange illness and its cure.
TBA	TBA	"Duplicado" "Duplicate"	TBD	TBD	1989
About clones and deception.
TBA	TBA	"La sombra" "The Shadow"	TBD	TBD	1989
On bitterness and a living shadow.
TBA	TBA	"Regalo de Navidad" "Christmas Gift"	Juan Mora Catlett	TBD	1990
A young man is tired of his family's conflicts and troubles, so for Christmas he asks Death for the gift of "one night of peace and quiet", not expecting that Death will fulfill his wish in her own way.
TBA	TBA	TBA	TBA	TBA	TBA
TBA	TBA	"Smog" "Smog"	Juan Mora Catlett	TBD	1989
About contamination.
TBA	TBA	"Ángel Pérez" "Angel Perez"	Alfonso Cuarón	Alfonso Cuarón and Carlos Cuarón	1990
A man attempts suicide, but his brother's angel saves him.
TBA	TBA	"Uno más" "One More"	TBA	TBA	TBA
About impostor androids.
TBA	TBA	"El último metro" "The Last Meter"	Rafael Montero	Story by : Óscar Montero; Teleplay by : Óscar Montero	1989
A woman goes to a complaints office when she is kidnapped by two men who will lead her to the worst experience of her life and also the last. In spite of her attempts to ask for mercy, they do not agree. At last one can observe a crude final in which the woman was kidnapped to traffic its organs.
TBA	TBA	"David" "David"	TBD	TBD	1989
About a girl who plays with an imaginary friend, not realizing it is her brother's ghost.
TBA	TBA	"Natiely" "Natiely"	TBD	TBD	1990
About a love of two young people who can not be together.
TBA	TBA	"Martha" "Martha"	TBD	TBD	1989
In the sideboard of a bookstore is a possessed doll, which follows Martha believing that Martha is her mother. This story is repeated every time the dolls victims suffer from hallucinations and die.
TBA	TBA	"Volar como pájaro" "Flying Like a Bird"	TBA	TBA	TBA
About a dead girl who returns to take revenge on her brother.
TBA	TBA	"Dulce Sandra" "Sandy Candy"	TBA	TBA	TBA
A girl who uses witchcraft on her teacher.
TBA	TBA	"Pin Pon Papas" "Pin Pon Papas"	TBD	TBD	1989
A group of naughty teens in the woods encounter Death.
TBA	TBA	"La lagartija" "The Lizard"	TBA	TBA	TBA
About a widowed parent who establishes a relationship with a woman with a secret.
TBA	TBA	"Humo rojo en las venas" "Red Smoke in the Veins"	TBA	TBA	TBA
About a cuckolded man who turns to a neighbor suffering from lycanthropy for help chastizing his wife.
TBA	TBA	"ISP 44" "ISP 44"	TBA	TBA	TBA
About a hospital, and the strange events that occur in it.
TBA	TBA	"Trampa en la casa" "Trap in the House"	TBD	TBD	1989
About an invalid woman who trapped alone at home while her husband is traveling.
TBA	TBA	"Yo quiero mi mamá" "I Want My Momma"	TBA	TBA	TBA
About a mother who has rare feelings about an evil that ravages her home.
TBA	TBA	"La casa" "House"	TBA	TBA	TBA
About a strange being that inhabits a house for sale.
TBA	TBA	"Doblemente yo" "Me, Two"	Alfredo Gurrola	Luis Eduardo Reyes	TBA
About possession.
TBA	TBA	"Noche de paz" "Night of Peace"	Ximena Cuevas	Paz Alicia Garciadiego	TBA
About mirrors.
TBA	TBA	"Mi pastel de XV años" "My 15th Birthday Cake"	TBA	TBA	TBA
About a house full of ghosts.
TBA	TBA	"Los otros" "The Others"	TBA	TBA	TBA
About a family and beings that live in the same house.
TBA	TBA	"Por tu bien" "For Your Sake"	TBD	TBD	1989
About a nurse and her unbearable mother who lives on.
TBA	TBA	"Equidad" "Equality"	TBA	TBA	TBA
About two spouses who plan to kill each other without the other knowing
TBA	TBA	"La pluma sabia" "The All-Knowing Pen"	TBA	TBA	TBA
About a husband who confesses his death wishes against his wife through the pen of a seer
TBA	TBA	"El hombre de trapo" "The Rag-Man"	TBA	TBA	TBA
About a woman who mistreats her husband by continually taking advantage of her immobility.
TBA	TBA	"Líneas cruzadas" "Lines Crossed"	TBA	TBA	TBA
A woman hears over the phone a plot between two men who want to kill her.
TBA	TBA	"El Hombre de negro" "The Man in Black"	TBA	TBA	TBA
About a woman stalked by a cloaked figure.
TBA	TBA	"No retornable" "Non-Returnable"	Alfonso Cuarón	Alfonso Cuarón and Carlos Cuarón	1989
A young man possesses the body of a serial-killer.
TBA	TBA	"La secta" "The Cult"	TBA	TBA	TBA
About a sect of cannibals
TBA	TBA	"Fantasma en condominio" "The Condominium Ghost"	TBA	TBA	TBA
About a ghost that inhabits some apartments and creates diverse evils to lure people there.
TBA	TBA	"Amor de ultratumba" "Love From Beyond"	TBA	TBA	TBA
A ghost who lives in the house of his nephews, which he himself inherited.
TBA	TBA	"La última morada" "The Last Residence"	TBA	TBA	TBA
About a Doctor of the early twentieth century who, believing his catatonic wife has died, buries her with all her jewels, prompting grave diggers to dig up her coffin and cut off her finger, awakening her from slumber. The man designs a coffin with a complicated system to alert the living in case the same situation is repeated, and rejoices that he can call for help after he, too falls victim to catalepsy, until he overhears his wife deciding to cremate his inert body....
TBA	TBA	"El huésped desconocido" "The Unknown Guest"	TBA	TBA	TBA
A man invites a vampire into his home.
TBA	TBA	"No todo lo que brilla" "Not all that shines..."	TBA	TBA	TBA
About an amulet that fulfills wishes.
TBA	TBA	"El juramento" "The Oath"	TBD	TBD	1990
About oaths and spirits.
TBA	TBA	"En el cuarto de arriba" "In the Upstairs Room"	TBD	TBD	1990
About a ghosts that robs a woman.
TBA	TBA	"Terror en tiempos de crisis" "Terror in Times of Crisis"	TBA	TBA	TBA
About the use of divination arts to discover the whereabouts of a murderer.
TBA	TBA	"Los acechantes" "Lurkers"	Alejandro Macias	Alejandro Macias	1990
About a boy with imaginary monsters for friends.
TBA	TBA	"Pesadilla" "Nightmare"	Rafael Montero	Pablo Struck	1990
About a woman who slays a man and now much face his ghost.
TBA	TBA	"Una cuestión de honor" "A Test of Courage"	TBD	TBD	1986
About a woman haunted by a tarantula.
TBA	TBA	"Noticias de mañana" "News of Tomorrow"	TBA	TBA	TBA
A newspaper brings the news in advance - a subscription costs one minute of one's life.
TBA	TBA	"Bolsa de valores" "Bag of Treasures"	TBA	TBA	TBA
About a magic bag which exactly what its holder needs at the moment.
TBA	TBA	"Mundos interiores" "Inner Worlds"	TBA	TBA	TBA
A family finds a door to a dimension populated by their evil doppelgangers
TBA	TBA	"Les gourmets" "The Gourmets"	TBD	TBD	1986
About a restaurant that specializes in a rare delicacy: human flesh.
TBA	TBA	"Ursula" "Ursula"	TBA	TBA	TBA
About resuscitation and zombies.
TBA	TBA	"Zangamanga" "Zangamanga"	Alfonso Cuarón	Alfonso Cuarón and Carlos Cuarón	TBA
TBA	TBA	"Los vampiros del video" "Video Vampires"	TBA	TBA	TBA
TBA	TBA	"A todos los amantes de la noche" "To All the Lovers of the Night"	TBA	TBA	TBA
TBA	TBA	"Acabalos Johnny" "The Johnny"	Alfredo Gurrola	TBD	1990
TBA	TBA	"¿Quién es esa mujer?" "Who Is That Woman?"	TBA	TBA	TBA
TBA	TBA	"La espera" "The Wait"	TBA	TBA	TBA
TBA	TBA	"Cansado de esperarte" "Tired of Waiting for You"	TBA	TBA	TBA
TBA	TBA	"Muerte por aburrimiento" "Bored to Death"	TBA	TBA	TBA
TBA	TBA	"Una de piratas" "One of Pirates"	TBA	TBA	TBA
TBA	TBA	"Los besos del Diablo" "The Kiss of the Devil"	TBA	TBA	TBA
TBA	TBA	"Testigo" "Witness"	TBA	TBA	TBA
TBA	TBA	"El anillo" "The Ring"	TBD	TBD	1989
TBA	TBA	"Reflejos fugaces" "Fleeting reflections"	TBA	TBA	TBA
TBA	TBA	"Km 22" "KM 22"	TBA	TBA	TBA
TBA	TBA	"Un signo de inteligencia" "A Sign of Intelligence"	TBA	TBA	TBA

== Crew ==
Creator:

- Carmen Armendáriz

Producers:

- Fernando Saenz de Miera, 98 episodes
- Carmen Armendáriz, 100 episodes (1989-1990)
- Alfonso Cuarón
- Emmanuel Lubezki

Directors, various including:

- Juan Mora Catlett
- Alfonso Cuarón
- Guillermo del Toro

Writers:

- Juan Mora Catlett
- Alfonso Cuarón
- Carlos Cuarón
- Guillermo del Toro
