= Stephen Fallon =

Stephen Fallon may refer to:

- Stephen M. Fallon, American literary scholar
- Steve Fallon (footballer) (born 1956), English former footballer
- Steven Fallon (born 1979), Scottish retired footballer
