= Quantitative research =

All procedures for the numerical representation of empirical facts

Quantitative research is a research strategy that focuses on quantifying the collection and analysis of data. It is formed from a deductive approach where emphasis is placed on the testing of theory, shaped by empiricist and positivist philosophies.

Associated with the natural, applied, formal, and social sciences this research strategy promotes the objective empirical investigation of observable phenomena to test and understand relationships. This is done through a range of quantifying methods and techniques, reflecting on its broad utilization as a research strategy across differing academic disciplines.

The objective of quantitative research is to develop and employ mathematical models, theories, and hypotheses pertaining to phenomena. The process of measurement is central to quantitative research because it provides the fundamental connection between empirical observation and mathematical expression of quantitative relationships.

Quantitative data is any data that is in numerical form such as statistics, percentages, etc. The researcher analyses the data with the help of statistics and hopes the numbers will yield an unbiased result that can be generalized to some larger population. Qualitative research, on the other hand, inquires deeply into specific experiences, with the intention of describing and exploring meaning through text, narrative, or visual-based data, by developing themes exclusive to that set of participants.

Quantitative research is widely used in psychology, economics, demography, sociology, marketing, community health, health and human development, gender studies, and political science; and less frequently in anthropology and history. Research in mathematical sciences, such as physics, is also "quantitative" by definition, though this use of the term differs in context. In the social sciences, the term relates to empirical methods originating in both philosophical positivism and the history of statistics, in contrast with qualitative research methods.

Qualitative research produces information only on the particular cases studied, and any more general conclusions are only hypotheses. Quantitative methods can be used to verify which of such hypotheses are true. A comprehensive analysis of 1274 articles published in the top two American sociology journals between 1935 and 2005 found that roughly two-thirds of these articles used quantitative method.

== Overview ==
Quantitative research is generally closely affiliated with ideas from the 'scientific method', which can include:

- The generation of models, theories and hypotheses
- The development of instruments and methods for measurement
- Experimental control and manipulation of variables
- Collection of empirical data
- Modeling and analysis of data

Quantitative research is often contrasted with qualitative research, which purports to be focused more on discovering underlying meanings and patterns of relationships, including classifications of types of phenomena and entities, in a manner that does not involve mathematical models. Approaches to quantitative psychology were first modeled on quantitative approaches in the physical sciences by Gustav Fechner in his work on psychophysics, which built on the work of Ernst Heinrich Weber. Although a distinction is commonly drawn between qualitative and quantitative aspects of scientific investigation, it has been argued that the two go hand in hand. For example, based on analysis of the history of science, Kuhn concludes that "large amounts of qualitative work have usually been prerequisite to fruitful quantification in the physical sciences". Qualitative research is often used to gain a general sense of phenomena and to form theories that can be tested using further quantitative research. For instance, in the social sciences qualitative research methods are often used to gain better understanding of such things as intentionality (from the speech response of the researchee) and meaning (why did this person/group say something and what did it mean to them?) (Kieron Yeoman).

Although quantitative investigation of the world has existed since people first began to record events or objects that had been counted, the modern idea of quantitative processes have their roots in Auguste Comte's positivist framework. Positivism emphasized the use of the scientific method through observation to empirically test hypotheses explaining and predicting what, where, why, how, and when phenomena occurred. Positivist scholars like Comte believed only scientific methods rather than previous spiritual explanations for human behavior could advance.

Quantitative methods are an integral component of the five angles of analysis fostered by the data percolation methodology, which also includes qualitative methods, reviews of the literature (including scholarly), interviews with experts and computer simulation, and which forms an extension of data triangulation.

Quantitative methods have limitations. These studies do not provide reasoning behind participants' responses, they often do not reach underrepresented populations, and they may span long periods in order to collect the data.

== Use of statistics ==
Statistics is the most widely used branch of mathematics in quantitative research outside of the physical sciences, and also finds applications within the physical sciences, such as in statistical mechanics. Statistical methods are used extensively within fields such as economics, social sciences and biology. Quantitative research using statistical methods starts with the collection of data, based on the hypothesis or theory. Usually a big sample of data is collected – this would require verification, validation and recording before the analysis can take place. Software packages such as SPSS and R are typically used for this purpose. Causal relationships are studied by manipulating factors thought to influence the phenomena of interest while controlling other variables relevant to the experimental outcomes. In the field of health, for example, researchers might measure and study the relationship between dietary intake and measurable physiological effects such as weight loss, controlling for other key variables such as exercise. Quantitatively based opinion surveys are widely used in the media, with statistics such as the proportion of respondents in favor of a position commonly reported. In opinion surveys, respondents are asked a set of structured questions and their responses are tabulated. In the field of climate science, researchers compile and compare statistics such as temperature or atmospheric concentrations of carbon dioxide.

Empirical relationships and associations are also frequently studied by using some form of general linear model, generalized linear model, non-linear model, or by using factor analysis. A fundamental principle in quantitative research is that correlation does not imply causation, although some such as Clive Granger suggest that a series of correlations can imply a degree of causality. This principle follows from the fact that it is always possible a spurious relationship exists for variables between which covariance is found in some degree. Associations may be examined between any combination of continuous and categorical variables using methods of statistics. Other data analytical approaches for studying causal relations can be performed with Necessary Condition Analysis (NCA), which outlines must-have conditions for the studied outcome variable.

== Measurement ==
Views regarding the role of measurement in quantitative research are somewhat divergent. Measurement is often regarded as being only a means by which observations are expressed numerically in order to investigate causal relations or associations. However, it has been argued that measurement often plays a more important role in quantitative research. For example, Kuhn argued that within quantitative research, the results that are shown can prove to be strange. This is because accepting a theory based on results of quantitative data could prove to be a natural phenomenon. He argued that such abnormalities are interesting when done during the process of obtaining data, as seen below:

When measurement departs from theory, it is likely to yield mere numbers, and their very neutrality makes them particularly sterile as a source of remedial suggestions. But numbers register the departure from theory with an authority and finesse that no qualitative technique can duplicate, and that departure is often enough to start a search (Kuhn, 1961, p. 180).

In classical physics, the theory and definitions which underpin measurement are generally deterministic in nature. In contrast, probabilistic measurement models known as the Rasch model and Item response theory models are generally employed in the social sciences. Psychometrics is the field of study concerned with the theory and technique for measuring social and psychological attributes and phenomena. This field is central to much quantitative research that is undertaken within the social sciences.

Quantitative research may involve the use of proxies as stand-ins for other quantities that cannot be directly measured. Tree-ring width, for example, is considered a reliable proxy of ambient environmental conditions such as the warmth of growing seasons or amount of rainfall. Although scientists cannot directly measure the temperature of past years, tree-ring width and other climate proxies have been used to provide a semi-quantitative record of average temperature in the Northern Hemisphere back to 1000 A.D. When used in this way, the proxy record (tree ring width, say) only reconstructs a certain amount of the variance of the original record. The proxy may be calibrated (for example, during the period of the instrumental record) to determine how much variation is captured, including whether both short and long term variation is revealed. In the case of tree-ring width, different species in different places may show more or less sensitivity to, say, rainfall or temperature: when reconstructing a temperature record there is considerable skill in selecting proxies that are well correlated with the desired variable.

== Relationship with qualitative methods ==
In most physical and biological sciences, the use of either quantitative or qualitative methods is uncontroversial, and each is used when appropriate. In the social sciences, particularly in sociology, social anthropology and psychology, the use of one or other type of method can be a matter of controversy and even ideology, with particular schools of thought within each discipline favouring one type of method and pouring scorn on to the other. The majority tendency throughout the history of social science, however, is to use eclectic approaches-by combining both methods. Qualitative methods might be used to understand the meaning of the conclusions produced by quantitative methods. Using quantitative methods, it is possible to give precise and testable expression to qualitative ideas. This combination of quantitative and qualitative data gathering is often referred to as mixed-methods research.

== Examples ==
- Research that consists of the percentage amounts of all the elements that make up Earth's atmosphere.
- Survey that concludes that the average patient has to wait two hours in the waiting room of a certain doctor before being selected.
- An experiment in which group x was given two tablets of aspirin a day and group y was given two tablets of a placebo a day where each participant is randomly assigned to one or other of the groups. The numerical factors such as two tablets, percent of elements and the time of waiting make the situations and results quantitative.
- In economics, quantitative research is used to analyze business enterprises and the factors contributing to the diversity of organizational structures and the relationships of firms with labour, capital and product markets.

== See also ==
- Antipositivism
- Case study research
- Econometrics
- Falsifiability
- Market research
- Positivism
- Qualitative research
- Quantitative marketing research
- Quantitative psychology
- Quantification (science)
- Observational study
- Sociological positivism
- Statistical survey
- Statistics
