= Robert Rodgers =

Robert Rodgers may refer to:

- Robert L. Rodgers (1875–1960), member of the U.S. House of Representatives from Pennsylvania
- Robert Rodgers (architect) (1895–1934), American architect
- R. H. Rodgers (born 1944), American classical scholar

== See also ==
- Robert Rogers (disambiguation)
