= Jill H. Larkin =

American cognitive scientist

- Born: July 15, 1943 (age 83); Chicago, Illinois
- Education: University of California, Berkeley
- Scientific career
- Fields: Cognitive science
- Thesis: Understanding Relations in Physics (1975)
- Doctoral advisor: Frederick Reif

Jill Huston Larkin (born July 15, 1943) is an American cognitive scientist, science educator and Professor at the Carnegie Mellon University known for her work on information representations.

== Biography ==
Born in Chicago, Illinois, Larkin obtained her BA in Mathematics from Harvard University in 1965, her MA in Physics from the University of California, Berkeley in 1972, and her PhD in Science and Mathematics education from the University of California, Berkeley in 1975.

Larkin started her career as High school teacher in mathematics in the year 1965–1966 at the Milton Academy at Milton, Massachusetts, and at the Tefari Mekonen School in Addis Ababa, Ethiopia in the years 1966–1968, where she chaired the mathematics department the second year. After her PhD graduation she was appointed Assistant research physicist and lecturer at the University of California, Berkeley. In 1978 she moved to the Carnegie–Mellon University, where she became Research Associate in its Psychology Department.

Larkin was awarded a Guggenheim Fellowship in 1986 in the field of computer science.

== Selected publications ==
- Larkin, Jill H. The role of problem representation in physics. Pittsburgh, PA: Carnegie–Mellon University, Department of Psychology, 1981.
- Larkin, Jill H., and Ruth W. Chabay. Computer-Assisted Instruction and Intelligent Tutoring Systems: Shared Goals and Complementary Approaches. Technology in Education Series. Lawrence Erlbaum Associates, Inc., 1992.

Articles, a selection:

- Larkin, J. H., McDermott, J., Simon, D. P., & Simon, H. A. (1980). "Models of Competence in Solving Physics Problems." Cognitive science, 4(4), 317–345.
- Briars, Diane J., and Jill H. Larkin. "An integrated model of skill in solving elementary word problems." Cognition and instruction 1.3 (1984): 245–296.
- Larkin, Jill H., and Herbert A. Simon. "Why a diagram is (sometimes) worth ten thousand words." Cognitive science 11.1 (1987): 65–100.
