= Gary Giddins =

American jazz critic and author (born 1948)

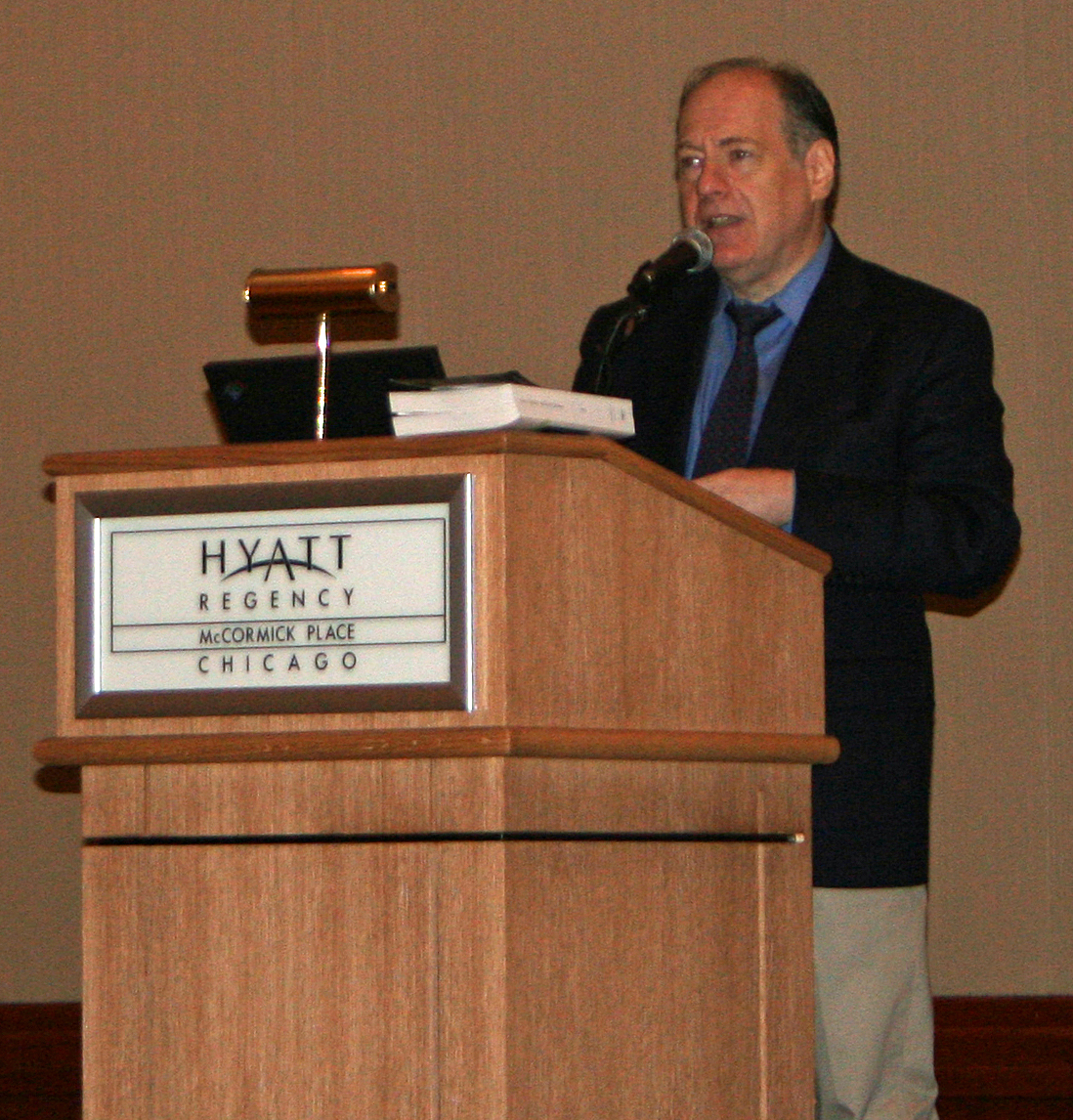
Giddins speaking at an American Library Association conference in Chicago, 2009.

Gary Giddins (born 1948) is an American jazz critic and author. He wrote for The Village Voice from 1973; his "Weather Bird" column ended in 2003. In 1986, Gary Giddins and John Lewis created the American Jazz Orchestra which presented concerts using a jazz repertory with musicians such as Tony Bennett.

For five years, Giddins was the executive director of the Leon Levy Center for Biography at the Graduate Center of the City University of New York.

== Selected works ==
=== Books ===
- Riding on a Blue Note (1981)
- A Moment's Notice: Portraits of American Jazz Musicians (with Carol Friedman) (1983)
- Rhythm-a-ning: Jazz Tradition and Innovation (1985)
- Celebrating Bird: The Triumph of Charlie Parker (1987, rev. 2013)
- Satchmo: The Genius of Louis Armstrong (1988, rev. 2001)
- Faces in the Crowd: Musicians, Writers, Actors, and Filmmakers (1992)
- Visions of Jazz: The First Century (1998)
- Bing Crosby: A Pocketful of Dreams - The Early Years, 1903-1940 (2001)
- Weather Bird: Jazz at the Dawn of its Second Century (2004)
- Natural Selection: Gary Giddins on Comedy, Film, Music and Books (2006)
- Jazz: The Essentials (with Scott DeVeaux) (2009, rev. 2014)
- Warning Shadows: Home Alone with Classic Cinema (2010)
- Bing Crosby: Swinging on a Star - The War Years, 1940-1946 (2018)

=== Films ===
- 1987: Celebrating Bird: The Triumph of Charlie Parker
- 1990: Masters of American Music: Satchmo - Louis Armstrong aka Satchmo
- 1992: John Hammond: From Bessie Smith to Bruce Springsteen (writer)
- 1999: Contributed to the documentary Barry Harris: The Spirit of Bebop. Giddins (& others) described how Harris developed and maintained an appreciation for Bebop and became a force to engage so many people in a deep love and commitment to music performance.
- 2000: Contributor of interviews throughout the 10-part PBS series Jazz by Ken Burns.
- 2004–2007: The Jazz Master Class Series from NYU: Narrator, interviewer, interviewee; series of seven volumes on Cecil Taylor, Jimmy and Percy Heath, Barry Harris, Clark Terry, Phil Woods, Hank Jones, Toots Thielemans
- 2003–present: Consultant, interviews, commentaries, liner notes for various films for The Criterion Collection
- 2014: Bing Crosby Rediscovered – American Masters

== Awards ==
- A 9th, 10th, 17th, and 37th Annual ASCAP-Deems Taylor Award Writers or Editors
- 1982 and 1990 Nominee for and 1986 winner of Grammy for Best Album Notes
- Guggenheim Fellowship 1986
- 1987 American Book Award for Celebrating Bird
- 1988 Honorary Doctorate in Fine Arts from Grinnell College
- ASCAP-Deems Taylor Award for Celebrating Bird [book], 1988.
- 1998 National Book Critics Circle Award in Criticism for Visions of Jazz: The First Century
- 1999 Jazz Journalists Association Excellence in Print and Book of the Year (for Visions of Jazz) Awards.
- Ralph J. Gleason Music Book Award for Visions of Jazz, 1998
- Ralph J. Gleason Music Book Award for Bing Crosby: A Pocketful of Dreams, 2002.
- The 2002 Association for Recorded Sound Collections Best Research in Recorded General Popular Music Award Bing Crosby: A Pocketful of Dreams: The Early Years, 1903–1940
- 2002 Theatre Library Association Award for excellence in writing on film and broadcasting for Bing Crosby: A Pocketful of Dreams: The Early Years, 1903–1940
- 2001 New York Times-selected Notable Book: Bing Crosby: A Pocketful of Dreams: The Early Years, 1903–1940
- Bing Crosby: A Pocketful of Dreams: The Early Years, 1903–1940 nominated one of Los Angeles Times's Best Books of 2001
- The 2003 Jazz Journalists Association Jazz Writer of the Year and Lifetime Achievement Awards
