= Stephen M. Fallon =

American philosopher

- Awards: Guggenheim Fellow

Academic background
- Education: University of Virginia (PhD), McGill University (MA), Princeton University (BA)
- Thesis: Degrees of Substance’: Milton’s Spirit World and Seventeenth-Century Ontology (1985)
- Doctoral advisor: William Kerrigan

Academic work
- Institutions: University of Notre Dame

Stephen Fallon is an American literary scholar and John J. Cavanaugh Professor Emeritus of the Humanities at the University of Notre Dame. He is known for his work on John Milton. He was a co-founder of a College in Prison degree program at Indiana's Westville Correctional Facility, where he has taught Shakespeare, Milton, and Lyric Poetry.

== Books ==
- Milton and Newton: Matter, God, and Modernity. Oxford: Oxford University Press, 2026
- Milton’s Peculiar Grace: Self-Representation and Authority. Ithaca: Cornell University Press, 2007
- Milton among the Philosophers: Poetry and Materialism in Seventeenth-Century England. Ithaca: Cornell University Press, 1991
- Immortality and the Body in the Age of Milton. Ed. with John Rumrich. Cambridge: Cambridge University Press, 2018.
- The Complete Poetry and Essential Prose of John Milton. Ed. with William Kerrigan and John Rumrich. New York: Modern Library, 2007.
