= Frederick Reif =

American physicist (1927–2019)

- Born: April 24, 1927; Vienna, Austria
- Died: August 21, 2019 (aged 92)
- Education: Columbia University; Harvard University
- Awards: Robert A. Millikan Award (1994)
- Scientific career
- Fields: Physics; Cognitive science
- Workplaces: University of Chicago; University of California, Berkeley; Carnegie Mellon University
- Doctoral advisor: Edward Mills Purcell
- Doctoral students: George W. Rayfield; Jill H. Larkin; Clifford Surko

Frederick Reif (April 24, 1927 – August 11, 2019) was an American physicist. He was an emeritus professor in physics and psychology at Carnegie Mellon University.

== Biography ==
Reif was born in Vienna, Austria on April 24, 1927, to Gerschon and Klara Reif and grew up near the Prater. His father committed suicide after he was forced to close his practice and was not permitted to work. His family left Austria for Cuba after the Kristallnacht on the MS St. Louis and was forced to return to Europe, where his mother, his sister, and himself disembarked in France, living as refugees under German occupation in Loudun before relocating to Limoges. In September 1941, his family secured a visa to the United States and emigrated to New York City by way of Spain and Portugal.

Reif completed high school at Erasmus Hall High School and entered Columbia University, but was drafted into the army at age 18. Upon completion of his services, he returned to Columbia to obtain his B.A. in 1948 and moved onto Harvard University to obtain his doctorate in 1953 under the guidance of Edward Mills Purcell. His thesis was on nuclear magnetic resonance in solid hydrogen. He joined the faculty of the University of Chicago in 1953, working with Enrico Fermi and Lothar Meyer. At Chicago, he focused on the studies of superfluid helium.

He was later hired as a professor at the University of California, Berkeley, where he taught from 1960 to 1989. At Berkeley, he discovered that electrons in liquid helium were attached to microscopic and quantized vortex rings, matching the prediction made by Lars Onsager and Richard Feynman. He also discovered gapless superconductivity, which was proposed by Alexei Abrikosov and Lev Gor'kov. His students at Berkeley included George W. Rayfield, Jill H. Larkin, and Clifford Surko.

He then joined the faculty of Carnegie Mellon University and remained a faculty member until 2000. His research in physics has focused on properties of matter at low temperatures, and he also focused on the physics education and the psychology of learning during the second half of his career.

Reif was known for his research in physics education. He is the author of popular textbooks such as Fundamentals of Thermal and Statistical Physics (1965), Statistical Physics (1967), and Understanding Basic Mechanics (1995), and co-founded the first interdisciplinary PhD program in physics with Robert Karplus at Berkeley, The Graduate Group in Science and Mathematics Education, also known informally as SESAME. He also helped write one of the Berkeley Physics Course textbooks with funding from the National Science Foundation aimed to improve undergraduate teaching in physics. For his contributions in the teaching of physics, he received the Robert A. Millikan Award from the American Association of Physics Teachers.

Reif was a fellow of the American Physical Society and the American Association for the Advancement of Science.

== Personal life ==
Reif died on August 11, 2019, at age 92. He was a longtime resident of Fox Chapel, Pennsylvania. His first wife was Mildred Dresselhaus. He later married Laura Ott and then Jill H. Larkin Wellman, his former Ph.D. student. His sister Liane Reif-Lehrer, was a biochemist and professor at Harvard Medical School, and his niece is anthropologist Erica Lehrer.
