= Diane Briars =

American mathematics educator

Diane Jane Briars (born 1951) is an American mathematics educator, the former president of both the National Council of Supervisors of Mathematics and the National Council of Teachers of Mathematics. She has been an advocate for the Everyday Mathematics, Connected Mathematics, and Common Core State Standards Initiative mathematics education programs.

== Education and career ==
Briars majored in mathematics at Northwestern University, graduating in 1973. She has a master's degrees in mathematics and a Ph.D. in mathematics education from Northwestern; the topic of her 1984 doctoral dissertation was Individual Differences in Rule Discovery: An Exploratory Study of the Inductive Reasoning Game Eleusis. She has taught mathematics at the middle school level in Evanston, Illinois, where Northwestern is located. After completing her Ph.D., she was a postdoctoral researcher at Carnegie Mellon University, working there with Jill H. Larkin, and briefly held a position as assistant professor of mathematics education at Northern Illinois University.

She joined Pittsburgh Public Schools in 1986 as head of mathematics education. At Pittsburgh, she instituted the Everyday Mathematics program for elementary-school mathematics and the Connected Mathematics program for middle-school mathematics. Her state teaching certifications were brought into question in 2005, as part of a political battle with the school board over the continuation of these two programs, and she was placed on leave from her position in 2006.

She stepped down to become a consultant and mathematics education developer, and to co-direct the Algebra Intensification Project of the University of Illinois at Chicago and University of Texas at Austin. She served as president of the National Council of Supervisors of Mathematics from 2009 to 2011, and of the National Council of Teachers of Mathematics from 2014 to 2016. As NCTM president, she advocated for the Common Core State Standards Initiative and used her platform to debunk what she has described as widely-spread falsehoods about the initiative.

== Book ==
Briars is a coauthor of What Principals Need to Know about Teaching and Learning Mathematics (Solution Tree Press, 2012) and of a teacher guide to the mathematics components of the Common Core State Standards Initiative, Common Core Mathematics in a PLC at Work, Grades 6-8 (Solution Tree Press, 2013).

== Recognition ==
In 2009 the Pennsylvania Council of Supervisors of Mathematics gave Briars their Outstanding Contributions to Mathematics Supervision award. In 2018 the National Council of Supervisors of Mathematics gave her their Ross Taylor/Glenn Gilbert National Leadership Award.
