= George W. Rayfield =

George W. Rayfield Professor emeritus
- Born: George William Rayfield; 1936 (age 89–90); San Francisco
- Occupations: Physicist, academic
- Awards: American Physical Society Fellow

Academic background
- Education: B.S., Stanford University 1958; M.S. and Ph.D., University of California, Berkeley 1964
- Thesis: Quantized vortex rings in superfluid helium (1964)
- Doctoral advisor: Frederick Reif

George W. Rayfield (born 1936) is an American physicist and a professor emeritus of the University of Oregon.

== Early life and education ==
The son of George and Hazel (née Wilson) Rayfield, George William Rayfield was born in San Francisco in 1936. In 1958 Rayfield finished a B.S. at Stanford; he earned both an M.S and a Ph.D. in 1964 at the University of California, Berkeley, advised by Frederick Reif, with the dissertation, Quantized vortex rings in superfluid helium.

== Career ==
In 1967, Rayfield joined the faculty of the University of Oregon as an assistant professor, and was promoted in 1968 to associate professor, specializing in the "application of biological materials to electronic devices". He was awarded professor emeritus status in 1999.

== Publications ==
=== Articles ===
- Rayfield, G. W.; Reif, F. (1964-11-30). "Quantized Vortex Rings in Superfluid Helium". Physical Review. 136 (5A): A1194–A1208. doi:10.1103/PhysRev.136.A1194.
- Rayfield, G. W.; Reif, F. (1963-10-01). "Evidence for The Creation and Motion of Quantized Vortex Rings in Superfluid Helium". Physical Review Letters. 11 (7): 305–308. doi:10.1103/PhysRevLett.11.305.
- Woolf, Michael A.; Rayfield, G. W. (1965-08-09). "Energy of Negative Ions in Liquid Helium by Photoelectric Injection". Physical Review Letters. 15 (6): 235–237. doi:10.1103/PhysRevLett.15.235.
- Hifeda, Y. F.; Rayfield, G. W. (January 1992). "Evidence for first-order phase transitions in lipid and fatty acid monolayers". Langmuir. 8 (1): 197–200. doi:10.1021/la00037a036. ISSN 0743-7463.
- Herrmann, T. R.; Rayfield, G. W. (1978-02-01). "The electrical response to light of bacteriorhodopsin in planar membranes". Biophysical Journal. 21 (2): 111–125. doi:10.1016/S0006-3495(78)85512-X. ISSN 0006-3495. PMC 1473346. PMID 623861.
- Sarkar, Abhijit; Pak, Joshua J.; Rayfield, George W.; Haley, Michael M. (2001-11-23). "Nonlinear optical properties of dehydrobenzo[18]annulenes: expanded two-dimensional dipolar and octupolar NLO chromophores". Journal of Materials Chemistry. 11 (12): 2943–2945. doi:10.1039/B107182N. ISSN 1364-5501.
- Simmeth, R.; Rayfield, G. W. (1990-05-01). "Evidence that the photoelectric response of bacteriorhodopsin occurs in less than 5 picoseconds". Biophysical Journal. 57 (5): 1099–1101. doi:10.1016/S0006-3495(90)82629-1. ISSN 0006-3495. PMC 1280816. PMID 19431755.
- Schoepe, W.; Rayfield, G. W. (1973-06-01). "Tunneling from Electronic Bubble States in Liquid Helium through the Liquid-Vapor Interface". Physical Review A. 7 (6): 2111–2121. doi:10.1103/PhysRevA.7.2111.
- Schmidt, P. K.; Rayfield, G. W. (1994-07-01). "Hyper-Rayleigh light scattering from an aqueous suspension of purple membrane". Applied Optics. 33 (19): 4286–4292. doi:10.1364/AO.33.004286. ISSN 2155-3165. PMID 20935785.
- Rayfield, G. W. (1966-05-23). "Roton Emission from Negative Ions in Helium II". Physical Review Letters. 16 (21): 934–936. doi:10.1103/PhysRevLett.16.934.
- Rayfield, G. W. (1968-04-05). "Study of the Ion---Vortex-Ring Transition". Physical Review. 168 (1): 222–233. doi:10.1103/PhysRev.168.222.

=== Patents ===
- US5825725A, Rayfield, George W. & Hsu, Kuo-Chung, "Method and apparatus for reversible optical data storage", issued 1998-10-20

== Awards, honors ==
Rayfield was named a Fellow in the American Physical Society in 1995, after being nominated by the Division of Biological Physics. Rayfield was cited for "definitive experimental proof for quantized vortex rings in superfluid helium; for high precision studies on phase transitions in monolayers; for extensive studies on the optical and electrical properties of bacteriorhodopsin, and ensuing device applications."

== See also ==
- List of fellows of the American Physical Society (1972–1997)
