= Paz Errázuriz =

Chilean photographer (born 1944)

Paz Errázuriz Körner
- Born: February 2, 1944 (age 82); Santiago
- Education: Cambridge Institute of Education, England BA in Education from the Catholic University of Chile Self taught in Photography
- Website: www.pazerrazuriz.com

Paz Errázuriz (born 2 February 1944 in Santiago, Chile) is a Chilean photographer. Errázuriz documented marginalized communities such as sex workers, psychiatric patients, and circus performers during the military dictatorship of Chile. Errázuriz's has said about her work: "They are topics that society doesn't look at, and my intention is to encourage people to dare to look." She was a teacher at a primary school when Augusto Pinochet overtook Chile's Presidential Palace in 1973, inspiring her to begin her photography career. She is the co-founder of the Association of Independent Photographers (AFI). Originally titled the "Asociación de Fotógrafos Independientes," she helped create the AFI in 1981 to make it easier for artists in Chile to find legal support and organize group art shows.

She is also a collaborator for the magazine Apsi and of diverse press agencies. She is known for her work in marginalized communities. Errázuriz goes on to say about her work: "...what I photograph has to do with people who are not at the center, who stand outside and have always been subordinated to power." Errázuriz began her career in the 1970s, and ever since she has been a voice for subordinate groups in society, more specifically, in Chile.

She was a primary school teacher at the time when she started her photography, and was slowly taking pictures "under the radar."

== Artworks ==
Errázuriz has put out multiple collections that includes Sex, Instrument of Survival, which was published in her 2016 book Paz Errázuriz, which contains multiple collections of her works. The photographs featured in Sex, Instrument of Survival were taken from several of her more specific collections, specifically Adam's apple, Brothels, and Dolls: Chile-Peru border. Also known as La Manzana de Adán, Adam's apple is a collection of photographs taken from 1982 through 1987 and depicts transgender women prostitutes working in brothels located in Santiago and Talca, Chile. She spent time living with and getting to know these women personally for her project. She took several photos of three particular women from the same brothel community: Pilar, Evelyn and Mercedes. Many of the people who were photographed in this collection feared for their life, as gender variance and homosexuality were deemed particularly unacceptable and shameful during this time in Chilean history. This made cross-dressing a dangerous thing for these transvestite prostitutes to do, despite them seeing it as an outward expression of their true selves. Errázuriz used the medium of photography to show the marginalization of this population. Errázuriz said that during her time with these women she "learned so much about love, community, and I found a family that I wish had always been my own."

Another collection of photographs by Errázuriz is Impediments of the Gaze, which was published in her 2016 book called, Paz Errázuriz. The pictures featured in this collection were taken from her series called, Blindness and Blinding Light. In this series Errázuriz wanted to highlight the conditions of being blind and a condition called achromatopsia. She specifically showcased these conditions as a metaphor to most of her work being black and white. This work was done in 2003 in Chile. In the series Stages of Life (And Death) Errázuriz displays photographs of children and elderly individuals to showcase the different stages of life and death. These photographs range from the late 1990s to the early and looks at the different aspects of being human through the lens of her camera.

This book also includes a collection called Agents and Spaces of Social Change. This collection featured the oppression that Chile was facing during the dictatorship, and the progression of it getting better and sometimes worse. This collection contains black and white photographs taken between the late 1970s to the early 2000s. Errázuriz was trying to show the different aspects of people's lives during the time of the dictatorship.

== Collections ==
Her work has been collected by the Museum of Modern Art, Tate, and the Chilean National Museum of Fine Arts.

== Style and influences ==
The photography of Paz Errázuriz looks at different aspects of human life. She has been doing photography for a little over forty years. She more specifically looked at the daily life of citizens in Chile during the political regime. She is drawn to capture populations that are marginalized and were affected by the government during the 70s and 80s. She wanted to capture what their experience was like whether it was daily life or social movements. She captured photos of lower class status citizens in Chilean society during this distressful period in history.

Errázuriz always made sure to have her camera in hand when in public places although it was not acceptable at this time for women to be taking pictures on the streets of Chile during the dictatorship, so for Errázuriz to be doing so it was a bold statement. Physically taking pictures with a camera was a symbolic statement for standing up against the military regime during this time. Errázuriz was personally affected by the military dictatorship of Chile at this time. Her own house was raided by the police in 1973, so she understood personally the circumstances of this period in history. Errázuriz made a statement about taking photos during the time of the dictatorship saying, "'The need to photograph was a constant, but one had to be extremely careful' – Paz Errázuriz".

== Publications ==
- Marco Antonio de la Parra; Ariel Dorfman (1990). Susan Meiselas (ed.). Chile from within, 1973-1988. Photographs by Paz Errázuriz [et al.] (1st ed.). New York: W.W. Norton. ISBN 9780393306538.
- Amalia (children's story, text and photographs by Paz Errázuriz), Santiago 1973 ISBN 9789568377458
- Amor de Errázuriz-Fotógrafo (text Patricio Marchant), Santiago, 1983
- La manzana de Adán (text Claudia Donoso), Santiago 1990
- La manzana de Adán Expanded Edition (texts Claudia Donoso, Cecilia Brunson, Rita Ferrer, Pedro Lemebel, Juan Pablo Sutherland, Juan Yarur)(editor Soledad García)(translation Kristina Cordero)(art direction Jerónimo Pérez) (edition Rita Ferrer text Camila Bralic) Santiago 2014 ISBN 978-9569558-00-9
- Paz Errázuriz, Santiago 2015

== Solo exhibitions ==
- 2025 Paz Errázuriz: Dare to Look, MK Gallery, Milton Keynes, UK
- 2018 Brooklyn Museum, Brooklyn, Radical Women: Latin American Art, 1960–1985
- 2018 "Another Kind of Life", Barbican Gallery, London. UK
- 2018 "Paz Errázuriz", Museum of Fine Arts. Santiago, Chile.
- 2017 "Paz Errázuriz", Atelier de la Mecanique, Arles, France.
- 2017 Stories of Sexuality, MASP, San Paulo, Brazil.
- 2017 "Paz Errázuriz", Museo Amparo, Puebla, Mexico.
- 2016 "Storms", National Historical Museum, La Serena, Chile.
- 2016 "Paz Errázuriz", Centro Cultura Antiguo Instituto, Gijón, Spain. & Alvarez Bravo Center, Oaxaca, Mexico.
- 2015 56th Venice Biennale. Venice, Chilean Pavilion
- 2015 Inside-Outside, Retrospective. Mapfre Foundation. Madrid Spain.
- 2015 Dark Mirror, Art from Latin America since 1968, Kunstmuseum, Wolfburg, Germany.
- 2015 "Paz Errazuriz", D21 Art Projects, Santiago, Chile.
- 2014 Chilean art in Cuban collections. National Museum of Fine Arts, Casa de Las Améeicas. Havana Cuba.
- 2014 "Urbes Mutantes" ICP International Center of Photography. New York USES.
- 2014 "Paz Errázuriz, Photography", Berkeley Art Museum. Cause.
- 2014 Biennial of Tucumán. San José de Tucumán, Argentina.
- 2014 Poetry and Dreams. Tate. London UK.
- 2013 "Cuerpos", Espacio Mínimo Gallery, Madrid, Spain.
- 2012 "The Fight against the Angel", Gallery 64, Santiago, Chile.
- 2012 "Here we are", PhotoEspaña 2012. Circulo de Bellas Artes. Madrid, Spain.
- 2012 "Chile, Art and Politics" Reina Sofía Museum, Madrid, Spain.
- 2011 "The Light that Blinds Me", Paz Errázuriz and Malú Urriola. Galería E, Valparaíso, Chile.
- 2010 "Mois de la Photo" Maison de L'Amerique Latine, Paris, France.
- 2010 "The Light that Blinds Me" MAC. Museum of Contemporary Art, Santiago, Chile. [To inaugurate]
- 2010 "Huellas del Catidiano." Mohammed Fassi Gallery. Rabat. Morocco.
- 2009 "Workshop Culture" with Luis Poirot. Cultural Institute Las Condes. Santiago, Chile.
- 2008 "The Chileans I Calbuco" House of Culture, Calbuco, Chile.
- 2007 "The Chileans I Calbuco" AFA Gallery, Santiago.
- 2007 "The Battle against the Angel" MAC, Valdivia. Chile.
- 2006 "Bodies" Espace Arpete. Paris. [MoisOFF] France
- 2006 "Paz Errázuriz, Photographs Chile 1981-2002" Museum of Osma, Lima, Peru.
- 2006 "Paz Errázuriz, Photographs Chile 1981-2002" Centro Cultural Borges. Buenos Aires, Argentina.
- 2005 "Exéresis" Libería Metales Pesados. Santiago, Chile.
- 2005 "Paz Errázuriz, Photographs" Lord Cochrane Museum, Valparaíso, Chile.
- 2005 "Paz Errázuriz, Photographs" Espacio Achromatik. Paris, France.
- 2005 "La Mirad" Art Museum of the Bank of the Republic. Bogota, Colombia.
- 2004 "Chilean Art Passing Borders" Klovicevi Gallery Dvori. Zagreb, Croatia.
- 2004 Replicas y sombras / Reiterations & Shadows - retrospective / retrospective 1983- 2002. Fundación Telefónica, Santiago, Chile.
- 2002 The infarct of the soul / The Infarct of the Soul Photogallery San Martin, Buenos Aires, Argentina.
- 2001 The sacrifice / The Sacrifice (video). Galería Animal, Santiago, Chile.
- 1998 Boxer I / Boxer I, Gallery Muro Sur, Santiago, Chile.
- 1996 The Nomads of the Sea / The Nomads of the Sea, National Museum of Fine Arts Santiago, Chile.
- 1992 Paz Errázuriz: Photographs 1981–1991, Museo de Arte Contemporáneo Carillo Gil, Mexico City, Mexico.
- 1992 Photographs by Paz Errázuriz, The Photography Gallery, Toronto, Canada.
- 1991 A certain time / A Certain Time, National Museum of Fine Arts, Santiago, Chile.
- 1989 The apple of Adam / Adam's Apple, The Australian Center for Photography. Sydney, Australia. Itineró a / Travelled to: Ojo de Buey Gallery, Santiago, Chile.
- 1988 De a dos / Two by Two, Gallery Carmen Waugh La Casa Larga. Santiago, Chile.
- 1987 The fight against the angel / The Fight Against the Angel, Gallery La Plaza, Santiago, Chile.
- 1986 Photographs, Carmen Waugh Gallery The Long House, Santiago, Chile.
- 1983 Entreacts / Entr'actes, University of Bio-Bio Concepción, Chile.
- 1982 Photographs, Galería Sur, Santiago, Chile.
- 1980 People / Persons, Chilean-North American Institute of Culture, Santiago, Chile.

== Collective exhibitions ==
- 2017 "Radical Women: Latin American Art, 1960–1985," Hammer Museum
- 2015 "Here we see ourselves", Centro Cultural Kirchner, Bs. As. Argentina
- 2013 "Ephemerides", National Historical Museum, Santiago, Chile.
- 2007 "Preventive Measures", Librería Heavy Metals, Santiago Chile
- 2007 "The Colors of the Meat", José Guerrero Center, Granada, Spain.
- 2007 Biennial Art in the Desert, Humberstone, Chile.
- 2007 "Signes d'existence", MAC Santiago, Chile.
- 2007 "Photographs: Errázuriz, Poirot and Weinstein", Fundación I. Patiño, Santa Cruz de la Sierra. Bolivia
- 2007 "Points of View", Bochum Museum. Germany.
- 2006 "On the Other Side", Women Artists, La Moneda Cultural Center, Santiago, Chile.
- 2006 "Allegory of the Baroque", MAC. Santiago, Chile.
- 2005 "Open Maps, Latin American photography 1991-2002" Fundación Telefónica, Santiago, Chile.
- 2005 "La Mirada", Art Museum of the Bank of the Republic. Luis angel arango library. Bogota Colombia.
- 2005 "Chile in 100 Looks", Plaza de la Constitución, Santiago, Chile. N. Art Museum, Bucharest, Romania. Convent of San Agnes, Prague, Czechoslovakia.
- 2003 La Mirada, Viewing the photograph in Latin America today, Looking at Photography in Latin America Today. Daros Museum, Zürich, Schweiz.
- 2002 Migrations / Migrations Chile-Canada, Matucana Cultural Center 100. Santiago, Chile.
- 2001 MAC Collection: experimental works 1979–1995. Museum of Contemporary Art MAC. Santiago, Chile.
- 2000 Museum of Visual Arts. Santiago, Chile.
- 1999 Women / Women. Photography Dissemination Center Santiago, Chile.
- 1999 Anniversary of the indigenous peoples / Native Peoples' Anniversary. Museum of Contemporary Art MAC Santiago, Chile.
- 1999 Guest Artists Salon / Saloon of Invited Artists Sala El Farol, Valparaíso, Chile.
- 1997 Chilean Photography / Chilean Photography. Museum of Image and Sound. São Paulo, Brazil.
- 1995 Havanna - São Paulo. Haus der Kulturen der Welt, Berlin, Deutschland.
- 1994 Chile in Venice. Venezia, Italy.
- 1994 V Biennial of Havana. Havana, Cuba.
- 1994 Fragmented Realities / Fragmented Realities, With Alberto Korda, Edgar Moreno. Gallery L, Havana, Cuba.
- 1994 Six visions / Six Visions. National Museum of Fine Arts. Santiago, Chile.
- 1994 States of Loss / Loss States. Jersey City Museum, Jersey City, USA.
- 1993 Recovering Histories. Aspects of Contemporary Art in Chile since 1982. Jane Voolhees Zimmerli Art Museum Rutgers, State University of New Jersey. New Brunswick, USA.
- 1993 Latin American Meeting of Photography. Latin American Encounter of Photography. Caracas, Venezuela.
- 1993 Contact Proofs / Contact Testing. Jersey City Museum, Jersey City, USA.
- 1992 Desires and Disguises / Wishes and disguises, Five Latin American Photographers Five Latin American photographers. The Photographers' Gallery London, England.
- 1992 L'Amerique dans tous ses Etats, America in all its States. Art Museum of the Americas. Washington DC, USA.
- 1992 Photographic Integrity and the Vital Link with the Environment, Integrity of photography and its vital link with the environment. The Museum of Contemporary Photography. Chicago, USA.
- 1991 Old World New World / Old World New World. Three Hispanic photographers: Paz Errázuriz, Graciela Iturbide, Cristina García Rodero. Seattle Art Museum, Seattle, USA.
- 1991 Six Chilean Photographers / Six Chilean Photographers. Sala Patiño, Genève, Suisse.
- 1991 Women in Art / Women in Art. National Museum of Fine Arts. Santiago, Chile.
- 1990 Open Museum / Open Museum. National Museum of Fine Arts. Santiago, Chile.
- 1990 National Encounter of Fine Arts, ENART National Encounter of Fine Arts Mapocho Station, Santiago, Chile.
- 1990 Chile Seen from Within / Chile seen from inside. Traveling exhibition in the United States.
- 1989 UABC. Painting, Sculpture and Photography from Uruguay, Argentina, Brazil and Chile Painting, sculpture and photography from Uruguay, Argentina, Brazil and Chile. Staedelijk Museum, Amsterdam, Nederlanden.
- 1989 Images of Silence / Images of silence. Museum of Latin American Modern Art Organization of American States. Washington DC, USA.
- 1989 Chilean Women / Chilean Women. Focus Gallery, Vancouver, Canada. Itineró a / Traveled to: Palazzo Valentini, Rome, Italy.
- 1987 A Marginal Body: the Photographic Image in Latin America / A marginal body: the photographic image in Latin America. The Australian Center for Photography. Sydney, Australia.
- 1987 Chile lives / Chile Is Alive. Circle of Fine Arts. Madrid, Spain.
- 1986 II Biennial of Havana. Havana, Cuba.
- 1986 Art in Chile: Margins and Institutions / Art in Chile: Margins and Institutions. Experimental Art Foundation, Adelaide, Australia. Itineró / Travelled to: Artspace-Visual Arts Center, Sydney, Australia. George Paton Gallery, Melbourne, Australia.
- 1985 Gallery Fondo de Sol Visual. Arts and Media Center. Washington DC, USA.
- 1985 Collective Exhibition of Women Women Group Exhibition Nairobi, Kenya.
- 1984 Chilean and Argentinian Photography / Chilean Photography and Argentina. Focus Gallery. San Francisco, USA.
- 1983 Chilenas / Chileans. Collective Exhibition of Women. Women Group Exhibition. Berlin, BR Deutschland.
- 1983 Association of Independent Photographers AFI. Independent Photographers Association. Nanterre, France.

== Awards ==
- 1986 Guggenheim Fellowship
- 2015 PhotoEspaña Award
- 2017 National Prize for Plastic Arts (Chile)
- 1981 Prize for entry on The Child in Latin America and the Caribbean, UNICEF, Santiago, Chile
- 1982 Prize for entry on The Chilean Family, Vicaria de la Solidaridad, Chile
- 1983 Prize for entry on The French Presence in Chile, Santiago
- 1989 European Economic Community Prize for Women Seen by Women, Venezuela
- 1990 Grant from the Andes Foundation, Santiago, for work in progress
