= Clifford Surko =

American physicist

Clifford Michael Surko
- Born: October 11, 1941; Sacramento, California, US
- Died: December 7, 2024 (Age 83)
- Education: University of California, Berkeley (B.S., Ph.D.)
- Spouse: Pamela Surko
- Awards: James Clerk Maxwell Prize for Plasma Physics (2014)
- Scientific career
- Fields: Plasma physics
- Workplaces: UC San Diego
- Thesis: (1968)
- Doctoral advisor: Frederick Reif

Clifford Michael Surko (October 11, 1941 – December 7, 2024) was an American physicist, whose works involve plasma physics, atomic physics, nonlinear dynamics and solid state physics. Together with his colleagues, he developed techniques for laser scattering at small angles to study waves and turbulence in tokamak plasmas and invented a positron trap (buffer gas positron trap) that was used in experiments worldwide to study antimatter. Surko also developed other techniques for studying positron plasmas and examined atomic and plasma physics with positrons.

== Early life and career ==
Surko studied mathematics and physics at the University of California, Berkeley, with a bachelor's degree in 1964 and a doctorate in physics in 1968. He was a student of Frederick Reif at Berkeley. He was then at Bell Laboratories in Murray Hill, where he became department head for research in semiconductor and chemical physics in 1982. Since 1988, he has been a professor at the University of California, San Diego.

He was a visiting researcher at MIT (Plasma Fusion Center, 1977 to 1984), at École Polytechnique (1978/79) and at University College London.

== Honors and awards ==
Surko was a fellow of the American Physical Society and the American Association for the Advancement of Science.

In 2014, he received the James Clerk Maxwell Prize for Plasma Physics for "the invention of and development of techniques to accumulate, confine, and utilize positron plasmas, and for seminal experimental studies of waves and turbulence in tokamak plasmas".
