= Mark H. Holmes =

American mathematician

- Born: November 7, 1950 (age 75); Onawa, Iowa, United States
- Education: University of California, Los Angeles; Colorado State University
- Occupations: Mathematician, educator, author

Mark H. Holmes is an American applied mathematician and Professor of Mathematics at Rensselaer Polytechnic Institute, where he served as Chair of the Department of Mathematical Sciences, and was the founding Director of the Center for Modeling, Optimization and Computational Analysis (MOCA).

== Personal life ==
Mark H. Holmes was born in Onawa, Iowa on November 7, 1950. He attended Colorado State University, where he earned his B.S. in 1973, and the University of California, Los Angeles, where he received his PhD in mathematics in 1978. His PhD thesis advisor was Julian Cole.

== Research ==
He is known for his contributions in mathematical biology, including mechanoreception (hearing and touch), neurobiology (Parkinson's Disease and the sleep-wake cycle), and tissue mechanics (articular cartilage).

== Educational initiatives ==
He has been instrumental in numerous educational initiatives. This has included starting the Rensselaer laptop program (in 1995), co-directing Project Links for developing web-based learning modules (1995–2003), creating the Gateway Exam (1999–2007), organizing the Rensselaer Calculus Video Project (2000–2008), and heading the Rensselaer GAANN program (2009–2016) for recruiting, and retaining, under-represented groups in mathematics. Holmes has written several textbooks based on some of the applied math courses offered at Rensselaer.

== Honors and awards ==
- Guggenheim Fellow
- Y.C. Fung Young Investigator Award
- Premier Award for Excellence in Engineering Education Courseware
- American Society of Mechanical Engineers (ASME) Curriculum Innovation Award for 2001

== Books ==
- Introduction to Differential Equations, XanEdu Publishing, 2020.
- Introduction to the Foundations of Applied Mathematics (2nd Ed), Springer International Publishing, 2019.
- Introduction to Scientific Computing and Data Analysis, Springer, 2016.
- Introduction to Perturbation Methods (2nd Ed), Springer, 2013.
- Introduction to Numerical Methods in Differential Equations, Springer, 2007.
