= Paul D. Allison =

American statistician and sociologist

Paul D. Allison is an American statistician and sociologist. He is the President of Statistical Horizons and Professor Emeritus of Sociology at the University of Pennsylvania.

== Education ==
Allison received an A.B. degree in sociology from St. Louis University in 1970, graduating magna cum laude. He completed his M.S. degree and his Ph.D. in sociology at the University of Wisconsin at Madison in 1973 and 1976 respectively. Following completion of his doctorate, Allison did postdoctoral study in statistics at the University of Chicago and the University of Pennsylvania.

== Career ==
Allison began his career at Stony Brook University, where he served as a lecturer. He taught at Cornell University from 1976 to 1981 before joining the Department of Sociology at University of Pennsylvania, where he would spend the next 37 years before becoming professor emeritus in 2018. He taught courses on Introductory Sociology, Introductory Statistics, Structural Equation Models, Event History Analysis, Longitudinal Data Analysis, and Missing Data, among others.

Allison's early research focused on career patterns of academic scientists. His current methodological research is on the analysis of longitudinal data, especially with determining the causes and consequences of events, and on methods for handling missing data.

Although much of his statistical work has been didactic, he has made original contributions in the areas of discrete-time survival analysis, maximum likelihood for missing data, model comparisons in logistic regression, and fixed effects models for panel data.

Allison has served as an editorial board member of the American Journal of Sociology, the Sociological Forum, Sociological Methods and Research, and Sociological Methodology. He was a council member for the Methodology Section of the American Sociological Association and a member of the American Statistical Association.

Beginning in 1986, Allison taught numerous short courses, including Survival Analysis, Categorical Data Analysis, and Missing Data, for the public as well as on-site for various organizations, companies, and government agencies.

In 2005, Allison founded Statistical Horizons LLC, a company that offers short public seminars on a variety of statistical topics.

== Honors and awards ==
Allison is the recipient of numerous awards. He was the Social Science Research Council Postdoctoral Fellow at the University of Chicago from 1977 to 1978. He also received the John Simon Guggenheim Memorial Foundation Fellowship in 1986–1987. In 1986, Allison was elected a member of the Sociological Research Association, and in 2001 he received the Lazarsfeld Award for Distinguished Contributions to Sociological Methodology. Allison became a Fellow of the American Statistical Association in 2010. He is also a two-time winner of the American Statistical Association's award for "Excellence in Continuing Education."

== Books and other publications ==
Allison has published eight books to date:

- Event History and Survival Analysis (1984, 2014)
- Logistic Regression Using SAS: Theory and Application (1999, 2012)
- Survival Analysis Using SAS: A Practical Guide (1995, 2010)
- Fixed Effects Regression Models (2009)
- Fixed Effects Regression Methods for Longitudinal Data Using SAS (2005)
- Missing Data (2001)
- Multiple Regression: A Primer (1999)
- Processes of Stratification in Science (1980)

He is also author of over 90 articles, chapters, and reviews over his career. Although Allison's methodological publications have mostly appeared in sociology journals, he has also published in the Journal of the American Statistical Association, Annals of Epidemiology, International Journal of Epidemiology, Psychometrika, Psychological Bulletin, and the Journal of Abnormal Psychology. His work has been cited over 75,000 times.
