= VISQ =

Scientific educational software

VISQ (Portuguese acronym for "Variables that Interact Semi-Quantitatively") is a scientific-educational software developed using Carnegie-Mellon's cT, in the year of 1993 by M. Thielo (as a physics undergrad at the time), based on Jon Ogborn ideas for semi-quantitative modeling of dynamical systems, for both MS-DOS and Macintosh systems (in 2012 the author published a new, Windows compatible version). Awarded by the Universidade Federal do Rio Grande do Sul (UFRGS) in 1994, the system is based on the theory of continuous neural networks, and have been used in many research projects since then, mainly in Master and Doctoral Dissertations in the area of environmental education. An introduction to VISQ (in Portuguese) can be found at the university site, and the software can be freely downloaded from the author's site
