= Rona Goffen =

American art historian (1944–2004)

- Born: June 7, 1944; Brooklyn, New York, U.S.
- Died: September 8, 2004 (aged 60); Princeton, New Jersey, U.S.
- Occupation: Art historian
- Awards: Guggenheim Fellowship (1984)

Academic background
- Education: Mount Holyoke College; Columbia University
- Thesis: Icon and Vision: the Half-length Madonnas of Giovanni Bellini (1974)

Academic work
- Discipline: Art history
- Sub-discipline: Italian Renaissance art
- Institutions: Indiana University Bloomington; Princeton University; Duke University; Rutgers University

Rona Goffen (June 7, 1944 – September 8, 2004) was an American art historian who specialized in Italian Renaissance art. A professor at Princeton University, Duke University, Rutgers University, she published several books – including Piety and Patronage in Renaissance Venice (1986), Spirituality in Conflict (1988), Giovanni Bellini (1994), Titian's Women (1997), and Renaissance Rivals: Michelangelo, Leonardo, Raphael (2002) – and was a 1986 Guggenheim Fellow.

== Biography ==
Goffen was born on June 7, 1944, in Brooklyn, daughter of Stella (née Friedman) and lawyer William Goffen. She obtained a BA from Mount Holyoke College in 1966 and an MA from Columbia University in 1968. After spending two years as an art lecturer at Indiana University Bloomington, she moved to Princeton University in 1973 under the same position and returned to Columbia to get a PhD in 1974; her doctoral dissertation was Icon and Vision: the Half-length Madonnas of Giovanni Bellini.

After being promoted from lecturer to assistant professor in 1974, Goffen moved from Princeton to Duke University in 1978, before being promoted to associate professor in 1980 and full professor in 1986, while also serving as chair of the Department of Art and Art History in 1983. She later moved to Rutgers University, where she became a distinguished professor in 1988 and chaired the Department of Art History from 1990 until 1996. She left Rutgers in 2004.

Goffen's field was in the art of the Italian Renaissance, and she often gave focus to the socioeconomic background of the Renaissance art scene. She published several books such as Piety and Patronage in Renaissance Venice (1986), Spirituality in Conflict: Saint Francis and Giotto’s Bardi Chapel (1988, focused on the Santa Maria Gloriosa dei Frari), Giovanni Bellini (1994), Titian’s Women (1997), and Renaissance Rivals: Michelangelo, Leonardo, Raphael (2002). She also edited Life and Death in Fifteenth-century Florence (1989, with Marcel Tetel and Ronald G. Witt), Titian’s "Venus of Urbino" (1997), and Masaccio's Trinity (1998). She was also working on two more books before her death: Renaissance Women: Art and Life in Italy, 1300-1600 and Fathers of Invention: The Last Judgment: From Giotto to Michelangelo. She also was a co-editor for Renaissance Quarterly.

Goffen was a 1970 Committee to Rescue Italian Art Fellow, 1976-1977 American Council of Learned Societies Fellow, 1976-1977 Villa I Tatti Fellow, and a 1986-1987 National Humanities Center Fellow. In 1986, she was awarded a Guggenheim Fellowship "for a study of Giovanni Bellini and the Renaissance in Venice". In addition to a 1980 visiting professorship at Barnard College, she was the 1997 Robert Sterling Clark Visiting professor of Art History at Williams College. She was part of the Renaissance Society of America board of directors from 1988 to 1994, as well as the National Gallery of Art Center for Advanced Study in the Visual Arts' advisory board in 1997.

Goffen died of ovarian cancer on September 8, 2004, in her hometown Princeton, New Jersey; she was aged 60. In 2005, Gabriele Neher said that "Goffen's prolific publishing record has established her as a key Italian Renaissance art historian in the twentieth century".

== Bibliography ==
- Piety and Patronage in Renaissance Venice (1986) (Note: Reviews of this book:)
- Spirituality in Conflict (1988) (Note: Reviews of this book:)
- Giovanni Bellini (1994) (Note: Reviews of this book:)
- Titian's Women (1997) (Note: Reviews of this book:)
- Renaissance Rivals: Michelangelo, Leonardo, Raphael (2002) (Note: Reviews of this book:)
