= John W. Cell =

American historian

John Whitson Cell
- Died: October 26, 2001
- Education: Duke University
- Occupation: Historian
- Employer: Duke University

John W. Cell (1935–2001) was an American historian. He was a professor of history at Duke University, and the author of several books, including one comparing segregation in South Africa and in the United States. He was awarded a Guggenheim Fellowship in 1986.

== Selected works ==
- Cell, John W. (1982). The Highest Stage of White Supremacy: The Origins of Segregation in South Africa and the American South. Cambridge, U.K.: Cambridge University Press. ISBN 9780511471049. OCLC 7333962575.
