= James S. House =

American social psychologist

James Stephen House
- Awards: Member of the National Academy of Sciences

Academic background
- Education: University of Michigan (Ph.D. 1972); Haverford College (B.A. 1965)
- Thesis: The relationship of intrinsic and extrinsic work motivations of occupational stress and coronary heart disease risk (1972)

Academic work
- Discipline: Social psychologist
- Institutions: University of Michigan (1978–); Duke University

James Stephen House is an American social psychologist. He is the Angus Campbell Distinguished University Professor Emeritus of Survey Research, Public Policy, and Sociology at the University of Michigan.

== Early life and education ==
House attended Springfield High School and graduated as the 1961 class valedictorian. Following high school, House attended Haverford College where he majored in history for his undergraduate degree and completed his Ph.D. at the University of Michigan.

== Career ==
Following his Ph.D., House served as an instructor, assistant professor, and finally an associate professor in the department of sociology of Duke University until 1978. He then joined his alma mater, the University of Michigan, and received an Investigator Award for his project "Social Inequalities in Aging and Health." Upon earning his award, he was also elected a member of the American Academy of Arts and Sciences. From 2005 until 2010, House served as the Angus Campbell Collegiate Professor of Sociology and Survey Research. While serving in this role, he was elected to the National Academy of Sciences and received the American Sociological Association's 2009 Leonard I. Pearlin Award for Distinguished Contributions to Theory and Research in the Sociological Study of Mental Health. In 2008, his professorship was promoted to the rank of Distinguished University Professorship. Following the resignation of Robert Groves, House was appointed the interim Survey Research Center director.

Nearing the end of his tenure at U-M, House was named the Henry Russel Lecturer for 2013 "in recognition of exceptional achievements in research, scholarship or creative endeavors, and an outstanding record of teaching, mentoring and service." Following his retirement, House published Beyond Obamacare: Life, Death, and Social Policy through the Sage Foundation.

== Selected publications ==
The following is a list of selected publications:

- Work Stress and Social Support (1981)
- Aging, Health Behaviors, and Health Outcomes (1992)
- Sociological Perspectives on Social Psychology (1995)
- International Encyclopedia of the Social and Behavioral Sciences (2001)
- A Telescope on Society: Survey Research and Social Science at the University of Michigan and Beyond (2004)
- Making Americans Healthier: Social and Economic Policy as Health Policy (2008)
- Beyond Obamacare: Life, Death, and Social Policy (2015)
