= Return to Aztlán =

- Theatrical release poster
- Directed by: Juan Mora Catlett
- Screenplay by: Juan Mora (appeared as Juan Mora)
- Produced by: Juan Mora Cattlet, Jorge Prior, Jaime Langarica
- Starring: Rodrigo Puebla; Tonatiuh Alonso; Socorro Avelar; José Avilez; José Chávez; Rafael Cortes; Juan Diego Del Clero; Damián Delgado; Rodrigo Franco
- Cinematography: Toni Kuhn
- Edited by: Jorge Vargas
- Music by: Antonio Zepeda
- Distributed by: IMCINE
- Release date: November 6, 1990 (Sala José Revueltas)
- Running time: 90 minutes
- Country: Mexico
- Language: Náhuatl

Return to Aztlán (In Necuepaliztli in Aztlan, original title in Náhuatl) is a Mexican fiction film directed by Juan Mora Catlett starring Rodrigo Puebla, Rafael Cortés, Amado Zumaya, Socorro Avelar, made in 1990. It was the first feature film filmed in Mexico spoken entirely in Náhuatl, subtitled in Spanish in exhibition. The film was produced in the context of Nuevo Cine Mexicano (New Mexican Cinema) films.

== Plot ==
In the Aztec territory governed by Moctezuma I ("The Old"), there is a grave drought. Advised by his priests headed by Tlacaelel, the ruler accepts going to search the goddess Coatlicue, aiming to ask her help to avoid a catastrophe. A peasant, Ollin, participates in the research and finds Coatlicue, and while she recognizes that the Aztecs have been abandoned, she decides to help them. The advisers of Moctezuma, anyway, decide to murder Ollin.

== Production ==
It was filmed in 1990 in Hidalgo and Mexico states locations. It premiered on November 6, 1990, in the Sala José Revueltas of the UNAM's Centro Cultural Universitario. The production was on charge of the director, Jorge Prior and Jaime Langarica, as well as of the companies Productions Volcano, Cooperative José Revolved, the UNAM, and IMCINE. The photography was by Luc-Toni Kuhn, musical direction of Antonio Zepeda, done with prehispanic origin and indigenous musical instruments; sound by Ernesto Estrada and make-up of Julián Piza. Screenplay was written by Juan Mora Cattlet totally in náhuatl advised by archaeologists and anthropologists, thanks to several scholarships of Foundation John S. Guggenheim, UNAM, INAH, ISSSTE and other official grants after an investigation of five years.

== Reception ==
Criticism about the film pointed out the challenge that involved the creator and his artistic choices (make-up, language, atmosphere, music).

The great success of his work was to decant, with the help of Gabriel Pascal, a plastic discourse that uses codex to design a makeup rather than costumes, providing to actors a powerful aesthetic medium

— Oscar L. Cuellar, “La voluntad creadora en Sueños y Retorno a Aztlán”, in La Cultura en México, extra of Siempre! magazine 1973, April 17, 1991

In Mexico it was an "unusual" blockbuster collecting 200 million pesos of that time and was six and a half weeks in billboard despite being not a commercial movie. The film's plot was criticized for being difficult to understand for the general public, and that the appeal of the film was "rustic". Protagonist of the film, Rodrigo Puebla, commented:

...for me that was the reality. The real image of ancient Mexicans that should be shown. Do they look like stone-age people? Yes. So what?

— Gonzalo Valdés y Medellín. “Film has defrauded preferences of Mexican people”, El Universal newspaper, April 15, 1991.

Film critic Nelson Carro praised the imagination and talent of the film, having re-created the look of pre-colonial Mexico despite a small budget, although he criticised some scenes for looking more like a documentary. Carro also praised for achieving its own aesthetic, having avoided depictions of foreign cinema and those in the Maya codices, although he criticized that at certain times the plot seemed incomprehensible to “inexperienced viewers”.

It was exhibited in the Latin American Film festival of Biarritz under the title Retuour to Aztlán, where it was well received, with special praise to the film's realisation. In 1992 the director was surprised because the film was not included in any cinematographic cycle of Fifth Centenary of the Discovery of America. The film was exhibited in the Film festival of Berlin, which the author asked support to his friends to be able to be present.

In 2006 Juan Mora declared that the producer of Mel Gibson's Apocalypto had requested him a copy of his film and paid US$9 for a VHS copy. He accused also that after view the trailer of the film, he believed that some scenes of Gibson's film had been copied from Return to Aztlan.

== See also ==
- Nuevo Cine Mexicano
- Cabeza de vaca
