= Alice König =

British historian

Alice König is a Professor of Classics who specialises in peace and conflict studies. She is Director of the Visualising War project and the Ancient Peace Studies Network at the University of St Andrews, and she runs the Visualising War and Peace podcast. She is a pioneer of Applied Classics, which seeks to bring ancient-world studies into dialogue with modern challenges to effect meaningful change.

== Biography ==
König studied for her BA and MPhil at King's College, Cambridge, and her PhD at St. John's College, Cambridge. She was the founder-director of the research network for Literary Interactions under Nerva, Trajan & Hadrian, a British Academy funded project, and now directs interdisciplinary research projects on Visualising War and Visualising Peace. König was a member of the Young Academy of Scotland (YAS) established by the Royal Society of Edinburgh in 2011, and in 2018 she was elected as co-chair 2019–2022. The organisation provides mid-career professionals with a platform to challenge social issues in Scotland and the wider world. König was particularly involved in YAS projects on Responsible Debate and the future of tertiary education in Scotland.

König has appeared on the BBC Radio 4 In Our Time panel as an expert on "Agrippina the Younger" (2016), "Pliny the Younger" (2013) and "Vitruvius' De Architectura" (2012).

== Selected publications ==
- König, Alice and Wiater, Nicholas (2025) • Visualising War across the Ancient Mediterranean: interplay between conflict narratives in different media and genres (Routledge)
- König, Alice (2024) ‘Teaching Classics as an Applied Subject’, König, A.R; Journal of Classics Teaching 25.49 (2024): 8-16
- The Visualising Peace Project: youth-led education’, L. da Giau, O. Meden, M. Ryan, A.R. König; Association for Citizenship Teaching Journal 59 (2024): 52-55
- König, Alice (2023) ‘Discourses of Authority in Pliny, Epistles 10’, in Intertextuality in Pliny’s Epistles, eds. Neger & S. Tzounakas (CUP), 67-96
- Visualising Peace: a virtual museum’, F. Consiglio, A.R. König, J. Oberholzter (33%); ‘E-International Relations 01.01.2023
- König, Alice, Langlands, Rebecca and Uden, James (2020) Literature and Culture in the Roman Empire, 96-235 CE: cross-cultural interactions (CUP)
- König, Alice and Whitton, Christopher (2018) Roman Literature under Nerva, Hadrian and Trajan: literary interactions, AD 96-138 (Cambridge University Press)
- König, Alice (2018) 'Reading Civil War in Frontinus' Strategemata: a case study for Flavian Literary Studies', in After 69 CE: Writing Civil War in Flavian Rome. ed. / Lauren Donovan Ginsberg; Darcy A Krasne. de Gruyter, p. 145-178
- König, Alice (2016), "Conflicting Models of Authority and Expertise in Frontinus' Strategemata", in König, Jason; Woolf, Greg (eds.), Authority and expertise in ancient scientific culture, Cambridge University Press, ISBN 978-1107060067
- König, Alice (2013), "Frontinus' cameo role in Tacitus' Agricola", Classical Quarterly, 63: 361–376, doi:10.1017/S0009838812000705, hdl:10023/12058, ISSN 0009-8388
- König, Alice (2009), "From Architect to Imperator: Vitruvius and his Addressee in the De Architectura", in Taub, Liba Chaia; Doody, Aude (eds.), Authorial voices in Greco-Roman technical writing, AKAN-Einzelschriften, Bd. 7., Wissenschaftlicher Verlag, ISBN 978-3868211818
- König, Alice (2007), "Knowledge and power in Frontinus' On Aqueducts", in König, Jason; Whitmarsh, Tim (eds.), Ordering knowledge in the Roman Empire, Cambridge, ISBN 9780521859691
