= R. H. Rodgers =

Latin philologist and emeritus professor of classics

- Born: Robert Howard Rodgers; May 24, 1944
- Died: February 20, 2024 (aged 79); New Haven, Vermont
- Occupation: Professor of classics

Academic background
- Education: University of California at Berkeley
- Thesis: "Petri Diaconi Ortus et vita iustorum Cenobii Casinensis"

Academic work
- Discipline: Classics
- Institutions: University of Vermont
- Notable works: Edited edition of Frontinus's De Aquaeductu Urbis Romae (2004); Works by Palladius and Columella

Robert Howard Rodgers (May 24, 1944 - February 20, 2024) was an American philologist who was emeritus professor of classics at the University of Vermont. His edition of Frontinus's De Aquaeductu Urbis Romae on Roman aqueducts was the first detailed commentary on the work for almost 300 years. He has also produced notable editions of works on ancient agriculture by Palladius and Columella.

Reviewers have appreciated the thoroughness of his work, which he combined with many bold emendations and conjectures in order to make texts with difficult and contested histories more coherent and readable. Some, however, have wished that he had done more to acknowledge alternative perspectives on Roman technical literature which would have added an extra layer of interest to his work.

== Early life ==
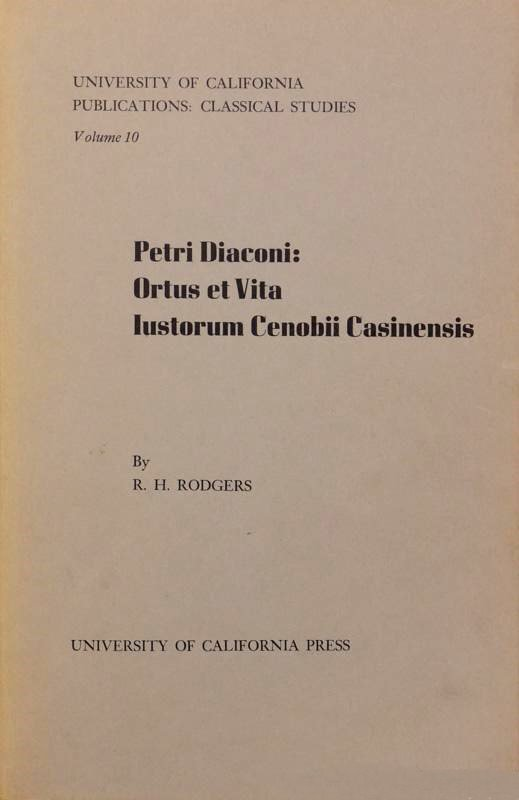
Rodgers's edition of Petri Diaconi Ortus et vita, iustorum cenobii casinensis, 1972.

Robert Rodgers was born on May 24, 1944. He completed his PhD at the University of California at Berkeley with an edited edition of Petri Diaconi (Peter the Deacon)'s Ortus et vita iustorum Cenobii Casinensis which was subsequently published by the University of California Press in 1972. Rodgers's work was welcomed by Braxton Ross of the University of Chicago as turning what had previously been seen as a "collection of pious stories" into a "cultural document".

== Career ==
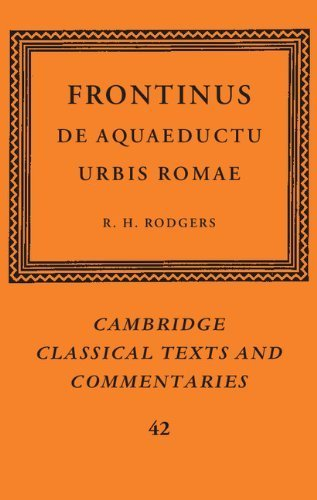
Rodgers's edition of Frontinus De Aquaeductu Urbis Romae, 2004.

Rodgers has spent his career at the University of Vermont where he is now emeritus professor of classics. He was a Guggenheim fellow in classics in 1986.

His first major work, after the publication of his dissertation, was An introduction to Palladius which was published as a supplement to the University of London's Institute of Classical Studies Bulletin (BICS) in 1975. In the same year, he published an edition of Palladius's Opus Agriculturae in the Bibliotheca scriptorum Graecorum et Romanorum Teubneriana series. Reviewing both for L'Antiquité Classique, Raoul Verdière saw the Introduction as the essential companion to the edited edition of Opus Agriculturae and wished the former could have served as the preface to the latter. He noted the extensive textual choices that Rodgers had made to make his edition coherent which had produced an edition of the highest importance. He did not agree with all of Rodgers's decisions, however, particularly over the dating of the work, and felt that the source material was so contested that other editions with different conclusions remained possible.

In 2004, Rodgers published his edition of Frontinus's De Aquaeductu Urbis Romae, the first detailed commentary on the work for almost 300 years. Reviewed by Alice König in the Journal of Roman Studies along with a related work by Michael Peachin, König began by reflecting on the ongoing reevaluation of a work that had once been seen simply as a factual guide to Rome's aqueducts, or, as Frontinus had described it, an administrative handbook for his work. The more scholars investigated the text, however, the more baffled they were as to its true purpose and meaning, seeing elements of political propaganda and auto-encomium (self praise) in it but reaching no firm conclusions. König noted that Rodgers had given his own interpretation, balanced between the various competing theories, but wished that he had explored them in more depth which would have added extra interest to his already exhaustive commentary and notes.

Marco Formisano noted in The Classical Review that due to the complex textual history of the De Aquaeductu Urbis Romae, it had received four editions in the twentieth century alone, but Rodgers's comprehensive commentary was the first since the Italian engineer Giovanni Poleni's edition of 1722. Combined with the very competent re-editing, this made Rodgers's version the likely future reference edition of the work. Formisano wished, however, that Rodgers had done more to put the text in the context of the debate about the position of Roman technical literature that had been taking place in scholarly circles in the twentieth century. Ari Saastamoinen in Classics Ireland also noted the bold emendations and impressive commentary.

In 2010, Rodgers published his edition of Columella's Res Rustica in the Oxford Classical Texts series along with the associated Liber de Arboribus but with the latter marked as incerti auctoris (by an unknown hand). Reviewing the text for Gnomon, David Butterfield appreciated the boldness with which Rodgers had crafted his "radical" version with over 350 new conjectures including more than 200 emendations of the Res Rustica. But he also noted that Rodgers had been more conservative with the Liber de Arboribus by adopting the view of Will Richter that the work is of uncertain authorship, rather than a juvenile work of Columella.

== Death ==
Rodgers died on February 20, 2024 in New Haven, Vermont.

== Selected publications ==
=== Articles ===
- "The Moore Palladius", Transactions of the Cambridge Bibliographical Society, Vol. 5, No. 3 (1971), pp. 203–216.
- "Frontinus On Aqueducts: textual temptations", Bulletin of the Institute of Classical Studies , No. 30 (1983), pp. 131–136.

=== Books ===
- Petri Diaconi Ortus et vita iustorum Cenobii Casinensis. Classical Studies Vol. 10. University of California Press, Berkeley, 1972. ISBN 0520093933 (Edited with an autograph manuscript and commentary)
- An introduction to Palladius. Bulletin supplement No. 35. University of London, Institute of Classical Studies, London, 1975. ISBN 0900587326
- Palladii Rutilii Tauri Aemiliani viri inlustris Opus agriculturae de veterinaria medicina de insitione. Bibliotheca scriptorum Graecorum et Romanorum Teubneriana. Teubner, Leipzig, 1975. ISBN 3322002144
- Frontinus: de Aquaeductu Urbis Romae. Cambridge Classical Texts and Commentaries 42. Cambridge University Press, Cambridge, 2004. ISBN 0521832519 (editor)
- L. Iuni Moderati Columellae: Res Rustica; Incerti Auctoris: Liber de Arboribus. Oxford Classical Texts. Oxford University Press, Oxford, 2010. ISBN 9780199271542
