= William Kerrigan =

American professor and historian

William T. Kerrigan is an American historian, author, and professor of history at Muskingum University in New Concord, Ohio. He is the Arthur G. and Eloise Barnes Cole Distinguished Professor of American History. His research interests include American cultural and environmental history, the antebellum and American Civil War eras, and early American history.

== Early life and education ==
Kerrigan earned a Bachelor of Arts degree from Austin College in 1985, a Master of Arts degree from Texas Christian University in 1987, and a Doctor of Philosophy degree in history from the University of Michigan in 1997.

== Academic career ==
Kerrigan joined the faculty of Muskingum University in 1997. He was promoted to full professor and installed as the Arthur G. and Eloise Barnes Cole Distinguished Professor of American History in 2009.

Kerrigan teaches a broad range of courses in American history, including subjects relating to the American Revolution, the Civil War, environmental history, and Ohio history. His research interests include the antebellum and Civil War eras as well as American cultural and environmental history.

In addition to teaching, Kerrigan has participated in public-history projects concerning southeastern Ohio. He has directed oral-history projects examining the effects of strip mining on communities in Appalachian Ohio and has worked with students on regional history publications.

Kerrigan has also been involved in preserving and presenting the history of Muskingum University. In preparation for the university's 175th anniversary, he helped create a historical exhibition featuring artifacts and information from the institution's history.

== Research and publications ==
Kerrigan's wrote the book, Johnny Appleseed and the American Orchard: A Cultural History, published by Johns Hopkins University Press in 2012. The book examines the life of Johnny Appleseed (John Chapman) and the environmental and cultural significance of the apple throughj American history. Kerrigan describes the work as a microhistory of Chapman and the apple in America.

Kerrigan has also written and co-authored several works concerning the history of southeastern Ohio and Muskingum University. His publications include A Pictorial History of the Salt Fork Region and A Pictorial History of Muskingum College.

In 2003, Kerrigan published an article in Teaching History: A Journal of Methods describing an oral-history project designed to help students understand historical narratives and the process of collecting oral testimony.

Kerrigan's research has also addressed the history of the early American republic. In 2016, he was selected as one of 17 historians to receive a fully funded research fellowship at the Fred W. Smith National Library for the Study of George Washington. The fellowship supported research for a planned book about Gideon Henfield, a sailor prosecuted in 1793 for allegedly violating American neutrality while serving aboard a French privateer.

== Awards and honors ==
Kerrigan received the Ohio Academy of Teaching Award in 2004, the Cora I. Orr Award for Faculty Service from Muskingum University in 2007, and the William Oxley Thompson Award for Excellence in Teaching in 2011. The William Oxley Thompson Award was described by Muskingum University as the institution's highest honor for teaching.

In 2013, Kerrigan received the William Rainey Harper Award for Outstanding Scholarship from Muskingum University for his scholarly work, including Johnny Appleseed and the American Orchard: A Cultural History.

In 2008, Kerrigan was named Person of the Year by the Daily and Sunday Jeffersonian for his involvement in community initiatives in the New Concord area.

== Public history and community involvement ==
Kerrigan has participated in public-history programs throughout Ohio, including giving presentations on Ohio history and the American Civil War for museums and historical societies. He played a major role in bringing the Ohio Chautauqua program to New Concord and served on the Board of Trustees of the John and Annie Glenn Historic Site and the New Concord Area Planning Task Force.

He has also collaborated with students on the management and digitization of Muskingum University's archival materials.

== Selected bibliography ==
- Johnny Appleseed and the American Orchard: A Cultural History. Baltimore: Johns Hopkins University Press, 2012.
- A Pictorial History of the Salt Fork Region.
- A Pictorial History of Muskingum College.
- "The Invention of Johnny Appleseed." The Antioch Review, 2012.
- "Collecting Stories about Strip-Mining: Using Oral History in the Classroom." Teaching History: A Journal of Methods, 2003.
