= Ruth Chabay =

American physics educator

Ruth Wright Chabay (born 1949) is an American physics educator known for her work in educational technology and as the coauthor of the calculus-based physics textbook Matter and Interactions. She is professor emerita of physics at North Carolina State University.

== Education and career ==
Chabay earned a bachelor's degree in chemistry in 1970 from the University of Chicago, and completed a doctorate in physical chemistry at the University of Illinois at Urbana–Champaign in 1975. Her dissertation was The Design and Evaluation of Computer-Based Chemistry Lessons, and was supervised by Stanley G. Smith.

From 1975 to 1977 she worked with the PLATO computer-aided instruction system at the Computer-Based Education Research Laboratory of the University of Illinois, and from 1977 to 1980 she was a researcher at the Laboratory of Theoretical Biology in the National Cancer Institute. After working as a software developer for four years, she returned to academic research in the psychology department of Stanford University from 1984 to 1987, and in the Center for Design of Educational Computing and the Center for Innovation in Learning at Carnegie Mellon University from 1987 to 2002.

She became a professor of physics at North Carolina State University in 2002, and retired to become a professor emerita in 2010.

== Textbook ==
With Bruce A. Sherwood, also of North Carolina State University, Chabay is the author of the two-volume textbook Matter & Interactions (Wiley, 2002).

== Recognition ==
Chabay was elected as a Fellow of the American Physical Society in 2009 "for contributions to the development of computer-based learning and tutorial systems, visualizations, and curricula that have modernized and improved how students learn physics".

In 2014, the American Association of Physics Teachers gave Chabay and her coauthor Bruce Sherwood the David Halliday and Robert Resnick Award for Excellence in Undergraduate Physics Teaching.
