= Juan Mora Catlett =

Mexican film and documentary director (born 1939)

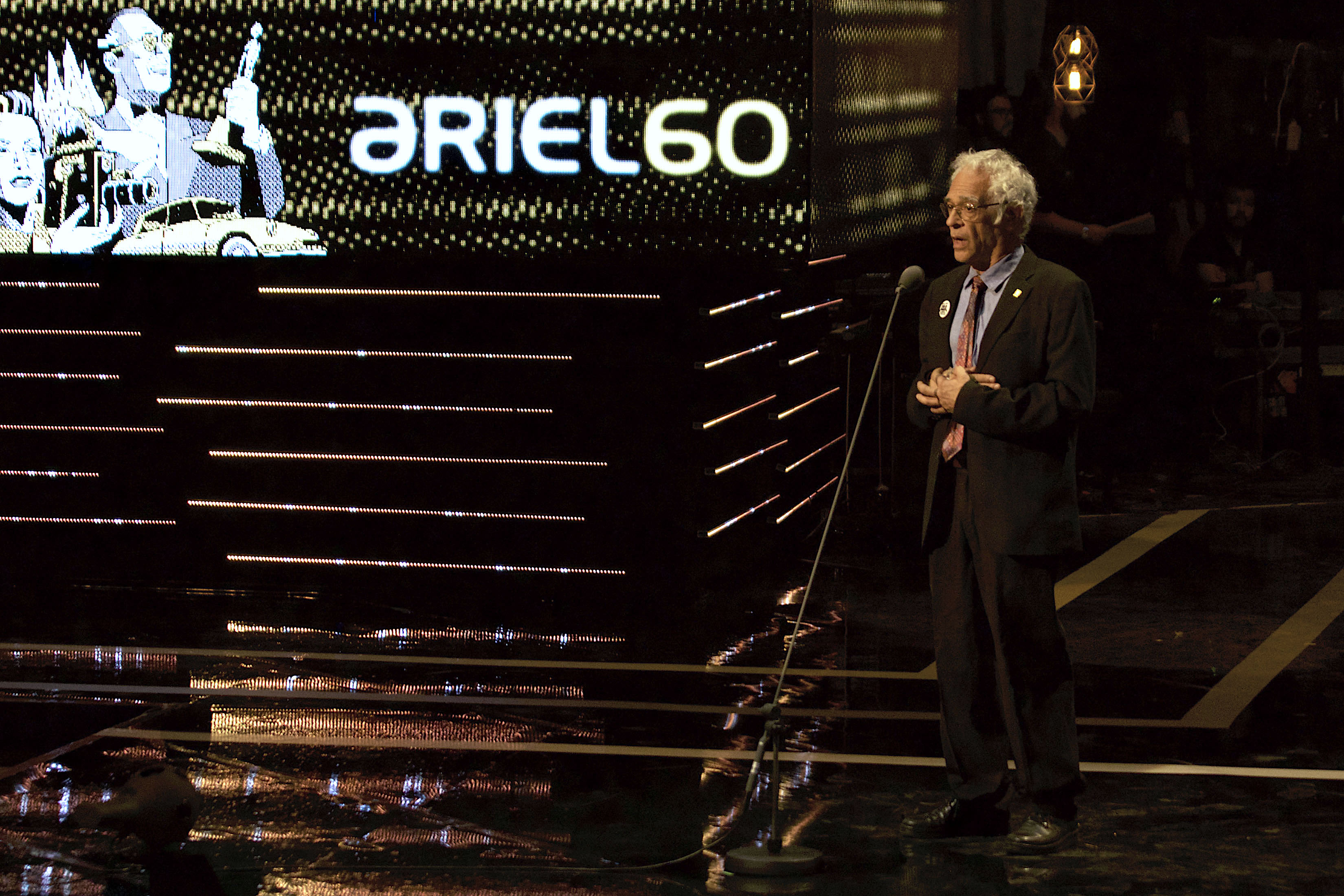
- Born: March 31, 1949 (age 76); Mexico City, Mexico
- Occupation(s): Film director, film producer
- Years active: 1967–
- Parent(s): Francisco Mora, Elizabeth Catlett

Juan Mora Catlett is a Mexican film and documentary director. He is known for making films focused on artists and the pre-Hispanic peoples of Mexico.

== Personal life ==
Mora Catlett grew up in an artistic family; his father Francisco Mora was a Mexican muralist, his mother Elizabeth Catlett was an African-American sculptor and artist, his older brother Francisco Mora Catlett is a Jazz drummer and his younger brother David Mora Catlett is also involved in the arts. Many of his nieces and nephews are also artistically gifted, including American model Naima Mora. In 1967 he studied at CUEC film school in Mexico city, and the following year he studied at FAMU, another film school, in Prague.

== Copyright claim ==
In 2006 Mora Catlett claimed that the producer of Mel Gibson's famed Maya-language film Apocalypto had bought a VHS copy of Return to Aztlán before the former movie was made. After the latter was released Mora Catlett accused Gibson and his producers of copying certain scenes from Return to Aztlan.
