= List of people from Lakewood, Colorado =

Coordinates: 39.7047°N 105.0814°W

Location of Lakewood in Colorado

This is a list of some notable people who have lived in the City of Lakewood, Colorado, United States.

== Academia ==
- Douglas Darden (1951–1996), architectural designer and theorist
- Irving Friedman (1920–2005), geochemist
- Carl J. Johnson (1929–1988), epidemiologist, anti-nuclear activist
- Sol Katz (1947–1999), software engineer
- Charles Repenning (1922–2005), paleontologist
- Tim Samaras (1957–2013), engineer, storm chaser
- Robert Zubrin (1952– ), aerospace engineer, author

== Arts and entertainment ==
=== Film, television, and theatre ===
- Hayden Byerly (2000– ), actor
- Derek Cianfrance (1974– ), film director, screenwriter
- Gregg Henry (1952– ), actor
- Katie Leclerc (1986– ), actress

=== Music ===
- Chris Broderick (1970– ), guitarist

=== Art and architecture ===
- Douglas Darden (1951–1996), architectural designer, artist, writer

== Business ==
- William A. H. Loveland (1826–1894), railroad entrepreneur, city founder
- May Bonfils Stanton (1883–1962), Colorado heiress and philanthropist

== Crime ==
- Dylan Klebold (1981–1999), one of two perpetrators of the Columbine High School massacre

== Military ==
- Elmer E. Fryar (1914–1944), U.S. Army private, Medal of Honor recipient

== Politics ==
=== National ===
- Robert E. Blackburn (1950– ), U.S. federal judge
- Brittany Pettersen (1981–), U.S. representative and former Colorado state legislator
- Daniel Schaefer, congressman (1936–2006), resided in Lakewood during his time in office
- Daniel B. Sparr (1931–2006), U.S. federal judge

=== State ===
- Norma Anderson (1932– ), Colorado state legislator
- Betty Boyd (1943– ), Colorado state legislator
- Andy Kerr (1968– ), Colorado state legislator
- Max Tyler (1947– ), Colorado state legislator

=== Local ===
- Steve Burkholder, mayor of Lakewood

== Sports ==
=== American football ===
- John McCormick (1937–2013), quarterback, punter
- Joe Romig (1941– ), guard
- Marc Schiechl (1987– ), linebacker
- Jeremiah Sirles (1991– ), offensive tackle

=== Baseball ===
- Bill Hubbell (1897–1980), pitcher
- Marty Lang (1905–1968), pitcher
- Tim Lollar (1956– ), pitcher

=== Ice hockey ===
- Mat Clark (1990– ), defense
- Nicole Hensley (1994– ), goalie

=== Soccer ===
- Jordan Angeli (1986– ), defender, forward
- Jeb Brovsky (1988– ), defender
- Aleisha Cramer (1982– ), midfielder
- Marian Dougherty (1984– ), defender

=== Other ===
- Chris Camozzi (1986– ), mixed martial artist
- Jeff Fosnes (1954– ), basketball small forward
- Scott Gaylord (1958– ), race car driver
- Mel Proctor (1951– ), sports announcer
- Steve Williams (1960–2009), pro wrestler

== See also ==
- List of people from Colorado
- Bibliography of Colorado
- Geography of Colorado
- History of Colorado
- Index of Colorado-related articles
- List of Colorado-related lists
- Outline of Colorado
