= 306090 =

- Discipline: Architectural theory and architecture
- Language: English
- Edited by: Emily Abruzzo, Gerald Bodziak, Joshua Bolchover, Alexander Briseno, Eric Ellingsen, David L. Hays, Jonathan D. Solomon

Publication details
- History: 2001–2013
- Publisher: Princeton Architectural Press (United States)
- Frequency: Biannual

Standard abbreviations
- ISO 4: 306090

Indexing
- ISSN: 1536-1519
- OCLC no.: 47413894

306090 was an independent biannual academic journal and book series which covered architecture. It was published between 2002 and 2013, by nonprofit arts stewardship 306090, Inc., and distributed by the American Princeton Architectural Press. 306090 published nine multi-authored thematic journal volumes, six thematic books, and one special issue that served as the official catalog for the United States Pavilion at the 2010 Venice Biennale of Architecture.

Contributors to each of the thematic issues ranged in experience, from students to professionals distinguished in their fields. The series brought together diverse writings and projects to explore "contemporary issues in architecture from every angle", many issues containing work spanning the arts and sciences. Contributors included: Jesse Reiser, Kengo Kuma, Lisa Sigal, James Buckhouse, Heather Roberge, Lori Brown, Hal Foster, Rafael Cardenas, Beatriz Colomina, Galia Solomonoff, Cecil Balmond, Gregg Pasquarelli, Hilary Sample, Craig Dworkin, Kent Bloomer, Els Verbakel, James Wines, Alessandra Ponte, and Olafur Eliasson. 306090 books were designed by David Reinfurt of O-R-G, and from 2007 to 2013, by Luke Bulman of Thumb.

As an organization, 306090 curated and organized lectures, round-table discussions, and exhibits at venues including The Architectural League of New York and Storefront for Art and Architecture. In 2010, 306090 was co-commissioner, with the High Museum of Art, of the American Pavilion at the Venice Biennale of Architecture.

== 306090 journal issues ==
- 306090 01, Where Are We Right Now ISBN 1568983476
- 306090 02, Student Discount ISBN 1568983565
- 306090 03, Urban Education ISBN 1568983840
- 306090 04, Global Trajectories ISBN 1568984065
- 306090 05, Teaching and Building ISBN 1568984324
- 306090 06, Shifting Infrastructures ISBN 1568984758
- 306090 07, Landscape Within Architecture ISBN 1568984847
- 306090 08, Autonomous Urbanism ISBN 1568985223
- 306090 09, Regarding Public Space ISBN 1568985444

== 306090 books ==
- Decoration: 306090 10, edited by Emily Abruzzo, Alexander Briseno, and Jonathan D. Solomon ISBN 1568985800
- Models: 306090 11, edited by Emily Abruzzo, Eric Ellingsen, and Jonathan D. Solomon ISBN 156898734X
- Dimension: 306090 12, edited by Emily Abruzzo, Jonathan D. Solomon ISBN 061518202X
- Sustain and Develop: 306090 13, edited by Joshua Bolchover, Jonathan D. Solomon ISBN 9780692000885
- Making A Case: 306090 14, edited by Emily Abruzzo, Gerald Bodziak, and Jonathan D. Solomon ISBN 9780615349091
- (Non-) Essential Knowledge for (New) Architecture: 306090 15, edited by David L. Hays ISBN 9780615779515
- Workbook: The Official Catalog for Workshopping: An American Model for Architectural Practice, edited by Emily Abruzzo ISBN 1616890177
