= The Architectural League Prize =

Annual architecture prize

The Architectural League Prize (formerly known as The Young Architects Forum) is an annual, themed competition and series of lectures and exhibitions organized by the Architectural League of New York and its Young Architects and Designers Committee. "The Prize was established to recognize specific works of high quality and to encourage the exchange of ideas among young people who might otherwise not have a forum."

== List of Architectural League Prize winners ==
=== 1981: Dwelling in the Cracks: Responses to the City ===
- Dodie Acklie
- Ralph Lerner
- David Cagle
- Michael McDonough
- Steven Forman
- Donna Robertson
- Robert Gryzwacz
- James Sanders & Roy Strickland
- Alexander Gorlin
- Mark Schimmenti
- Steven Holl
- David Spiker

=== 1983: Site, Scale and Spectacle ===
- Ace Architects: David Weingarten & Lucia Howard
- Ralph Johnson
- Gavin Macrae-Gibson
- Bumpzoid: Ben Benedict & Carl Pucci
- Robert Orr & Melanie Taylor
- Anthony Tsirantonakis
- David Chasco & Michael Andrejasich
- Wendy Tsuji
- James Evanson
- Robert Dell Vuyosevich
- Sophia A. Gruzdys & Jude LeBlanc
- Peter Wheelwright

=== 1984: Kindergarten Chats ===
- Ross Anderson
- Cary Tamarkin & Timothy Techler
- Lawerence A. Chan & Alex Krieger
- Billie Tsien
- Neil Denari
- Anthony Tsirantonakis
- Alan Shope, Robert Reno & Bernard Wharton

=== 1985: Rough Drafts ===
- Frederick Biehle
- Richard Maxon
- Dan Coma
- Taeg Nishimoto
- Douglas Darden
- Wellington Reiter
- Tom Grondona
- Mark Robbins
- Wes Jones & Peter Pfau
- Frederick Schwartz
- Ben Ledbetter
- Joseph Walter
- Mark West

=== 1986: Behind Closed Doors ===
- Stefanie Bradie
- Steven Lombardi
- Mike Cadwell
- Taeg Nishimoto
- Neil Denari
- Studio Terminale: Eric Kahn, Russell Thompson
- David Gregor & Irene Keil
- Tom Hanrahan & Victoria Meyers
- Christopher Scholz, Kenneth Kaplan & Ted Krueger
- David Hertz
- Linda Trobaugh
- Keith Hone
- Sulan Kolatan & William MacDonald

=== 1987: Bridges ===
- Karen Bausman & Leslie Gill
- Yann Andre Leroy
- Christopher Doyle
- Michele Saee
- Christopher Genik
- Donna Seftel
- David Glover
- Kenneth Schwartz & Judith Kinnard
- Kem Gardner Hinton

=== 1988: Hypotheses ===
- Florian Aicher & Uwe Drepper
- Carlos Jimenez
- Stan Allen
- Cameron McNall
- Matthew Bialecki
- Anthony Pleskow
- Brett Boyd Steele

=== 1989: Public Work ===
- Ann Cederna & Douglas Frederick
- John Randolph & Bruce Tomb
- Sheila Kennedy & Frano Violich
- Tim Swischuk
- David Kessler, Tim Schollaert
- Glenn Weiss & Peter Shinoda

=== 1990: Out of Site ===
- Janek Bielski
- Gisue Hariri & Mojgan Hariri
- Benjamin Gianni
- Neil Logan
- Group of Four: Francisco de Almaida, Scott deVere, Beth Weinstein, & Zanie Zainulabidin
- Omar Perez & Georgia Daskalakis
- Luke Lowings

=== 1991: Practice ===
- Thomas Bish & Hal Laessig
- Douglas Garofalo
- George Boyle
- Janis Hall
- Uwe Drost
- Craig Konyk
- Craig Newick

=== 1992: On Hold ===
- Yung-Ho Chang
- Johannes Knoops
- Preston Scott Cohen
- Scott Marble
- Kevin Kennon & Peter Moore
- Joe Mashburn
- Peter Pelsinski & Marc Tsurumaki

=== 1993: 12 ===
- Victoria Casasco
- Mark Goulthorpe & Yee Pin Tan
- Michael Morris & Yoshiko Sato
- Alicia Imperiale & Darius Sollohub
- John & Thomas Reistetter
- Amy Landesburg & Lisa Quatrale
- Claire Weisz & Mark Yoes

=== 1994: High Definition ===
- Byron Kuth & Elizabeth Ranieri
- Bryce Sanders
- Linda Pollak
- Michael Stanton
- Alastair Reilly
- Kramer Woodward

=== 1995: Time ===
- Laura Kurgan
- Michael Silver
- Joseph Krumpelmann
- Lisa Tilder & Stephen Turk
- John Nastasi
- Kevin O’Brien
- Mark Wamble

=== 1996: Form ===
- Marwan Al-Sayed & Janet Fink
- Kadambari Baxi & Reinhold Martin
- Architecture Research Office: Stephen Cassell, Thomas Jenkinson, Adam Yarinsky
- Mehrdad Hadighi
- Eric Hemingway
- Rick Joy

=== 1997: Vision Medium Culture ===
- ARX New York Frederic Levrat
- David Lewis & Paul Lewis & Zolaykha Sherzad
- Office DA: Monica Ponce de Leon & Nader Tehrani
- David Guthrie
- Kelly Shannon
- Kyna Leski

=== 1998: Position/Paradox ===
- Theodore Galante
- Tom Penn
- Karl Jensen
- Brian Rex
- Michael Meredith
- Tsuto & Meiko Sakamoto

=== 1999: Scale ===
- Sunil Bald & J. Yolande Daniels
- Edward Mitchell
- Vrinda Khanna & Robert Schultz
- Douglas Pancoast
- Omar Khan & Laura Garofalo
- Shih-Fu Peng & Roisin Heneghan

=== 2000: Second Nature ===
- Julia Czerniak
- Anuradha Mathur & Dilip da Cunha
- Jeremy Edmiston & Douglas Gauthier
- Terry Surjan
- Rhett Russo
- James Slade & Minsuk Cho

=== 2001: City Limits ===
- Thaddeus Briner
- Eric Bunge & Mimi Hoang
- Teddy Cruz
- David Erdman, Marcelyn Gow, Ulrika Karlsson & Chris Perry
- Petra Kempf

=== 2002: Material Process ===
- Jared Della Valle & Andrew Bernheimer
- Makram el-Kadi, Ziad Jamaleddine & Naji Moujaes
- Elena Fernandez, Arnaud Descombs
- Lisa Iwamoto & Craig Scott
- Antoine Regnault & David Serero
- Eric Liftin
- Meejin Yoon

=== 2003: Inhabiting Identity ===
- Stella Betts
- Lisa Hsieh
- Ben Checkwitch
- Mike Latham
- Stephanie Forsythe & Tod MacAllen
- Steven Mankouche

=== 2004: If…Then ===
- Gail Peter Borden
- Tobias Lundquist
- Keith Mitnick, Mireille Roddier, Stewart Hicks
- Anthony Piermarini & Hansy Better Barraza
- Fernando Romero
- Tom Wiscombe

=== 2005: Situating ===
- Tobias Armborst, Daniel D’Oca, Georgeen Theodore & Christine Williams
- Dan Hisel
- Tiffany Lin & Mark Oldham
- Greg Kochanowski
- Stephen Roe & Chiafang Wu

=== 2006: Instability ===
- Julie Beckman & Keith Kaseman
- David Benjamin & Soo-in Yang
- Craig Borum & Karl Daubmann
- Yansong Ma & Yosuke Hayano
- Julio Salcedo
- Betsy Williamson & Shane Williamson

=== 2007: Proof ===
- Benjamin Aranda & Chris Lasch
- Carlos Bedoya, Wonne Ickx, Victor Jaime, & Abel Perles
- Ivan Hernandez
- Chaewon Kim & Beat Schenk
- Dominic Leong, Jonathan Lott & Brian Price

=== 2008: Resonance ===
- Xu Tiantian
- Kathy Velikov & Geoffrey Thün
- Lonn Combs
- Ben Pell & Tate Overton
- Mark Foster Gage
- Ana Miljacki & Lee Moreau

=== 2009: Foresight ===
- Aziza Chaouni & Takako Tajima
- Frida Escobedo Lopez
- Ivan Juarez & Patricia Meneses
- Cristina Goberna & Urtzi Grau
- Phu Hoang
- Sung Goo Yang

=== 2010: ReSource ===
- Jason Austin & Aleksandr Mergold
- Marc Frohn & Mario Rojas Toledo
- Michael Loverich & Antonio Torres
- Emily Abruzzo & Gerald Bodziak
- Eric Schuldenfrei & Marisa Yiu
- Keith VanDerSys

=== 2011: It’s Different ===
- Ajmal Aqtash, Richard Sarrach, & Tamaki Uchikawa
- Jason Kelly Johnson & Nataly Gattegno
- Kiel Moe
- Unchung Na & Sorae Yoo
- Catie Newell
- William O’Brien Jr.

=== 2012: No Precedent ===
- Jorge Arvizu, Ignacio del Rio, Emmanuel Ramirez & Diego Ricalde
- Jimenez Lai
- Sean Lally
- Seung Teak Lee & Mi Jung Lim
- Michael Szivos
- Koji Tsutsui

=== 2013: Range ===
- Luis Callejas
- Brandon Clifford & Wes McGee
- Marc Fornes
- Rafael Luna & Dongwoo Yim
- Skylar J.E. Tibbits
- Bryan Young

=== 2014: Overlay ===
- Kutan Ayata & Michael Young
- Claus Benjamin Freyinger & Andrew Holder
- Adam Fure
- Thomas Kelley & Carrie Norman
- Jenny E. Sabin
- Geoffrey von Oeyen

=== 2015: Authenticity ===
- Dan Adams & Marie Adams
- Erin Besler
- Seth McDowell & Rychiee Espinosa
- Thom Moran
- Anna Neimark & Andrew Atwood
- Clark Thenhaus

=== 2016: (im)permanence ===
- Neeraj Bhatia
- Rania Ghosn & El Hadi Jazairy
- Juan Alfonso Garduño Jardón
- Hubert Pelletier & Yves de Fontenay
- Neyran Turan & Mete Sonmez
- Yasmin Vobis & Aaron Forrest

=== 2017: Authenticity ===
- Jonathan Louie & Nicole McIntosh
- Michelle JaJa Chang
- Kevin Hirth
- Mustafa Faruki
- Isabel Martínez Abascal & Alessandro Arienzo
- Greg Corso & Molly Hunker

=== 2018: Objective ===
- Anya Sirota
- Bryony Roberts
- Gabriel Cuéllar & Athar Mufreh
- Coryn Kempster
- Alison Von Glinow & Lap Chi Kwong
- Dan Spiegel

=== 2019: Just ===
- Rachel G. Barnard of Young New Yorkers
- Jennifer Bonner of MALL
- Virginia Black, Gabrielle Printz, and Rosana Elkhatib of feminist architecture collaborative
- Mira Hasson Henry of (HA)
- Gregory Melitonov of Taller KEN
- Cyrus Peñarroyo of EXTENTS

=== 2020: Value ===
- David Eskenazi of d.esk
- Garrett Ricciardi and Julian Rose of Formlessfinder
- Leslie Lok and Sasa Zivkovic of HANNAH
- Isaac Michan Daniel of Michan Architecture
- Ivi Diamantopoulou and Jaffer Kolb of New Affiliates
- Luis Beltrán del Río García and Andrew Sosa Martínez of Vrtical

=== 2021: Housekeeping ===
- Tei Carpenter of Agency—Agency
- Rodrigo Escandón Cesarman and Ricardo Roxo Matias of APRDELESP
- Liz Gálvez of Office e.g.
- Ilse Cárdenas, Regina de Hoyos, Diego Escamilla, and Juan Luis Rivera of Palma
- Germane David Barnes of Studio Barnes
- Lindsey May of Studio Mayd

=== 2022: Grounding ===
- Citygroup
- Nathan Friedman and Francisco Quiñones of Departamento del Distrito
- Isaac Stein and Maggie Tsang of Dept.
- Farzin Lotfi-Jam of Farzin Farzin
- Xavi Laida Aguirre of stock-a-studio
- Jose Amozurrutia and Carlos Facio of TO

=== 2023: Uncomfortable ===
- Katie MacDonald and Kyle Schumann of After Architecture
- Miles Gertler of Common Accounts
- Joseph Altshuler and Zack Morrison of Could Be Design
- Sarah Aziz and Lindsey Krug
- Daisy Ames of Studio Ames
- Sean Canty of Studio Sean Canty

=== 2024: Dirty ===
- Lola Ben-Alon of The Natural Materials Lab
- Strat Coffman
- Erik Carranza of Anonima
- Leah Wulfman
- Chase Galis, Christina Moushoul, and Sonia Sobrino Ralston of Office Party
- Rayshad Dorsey, Joseph James, Diego Zubizarreta Otero, Julian Owens, and Michael Urueta of Partners of Place (PoP)
