= Burkholder =

Burkholder is a surname. Notable people with the surname include:

- Dave Burkholder (contemporary), Canadian college ice hockey coach
- Donald Burkholder (1927–2013), American mathematician
- J. Peter Burkholder (born 1954), American musicologist
- James B. Burkholder (1918–2006), American army officer, activist for peace and social justice issues
- JoAnn Marie Burkholder (born 1953), American ecologist
- Mabel Burkholder (1881–1973), Canadian historian and author
- Max Burkholder (born 1997), American actor
- Seth Burkholder (born 1982), American football player
- Steve Burkholder (contemporary), Republican politician from Colorado, mayor of Lakewood 1999–2007
- Walter H. Burkholder (1898–1977), American plant pathologist
