= Kanekar =

Kanekar is a surname. Notable people with the surname include:

- Aarati Kanekar, Indian architect
- Amita Kanekar, Indian writer and architectural historian
- Anant Kanekar (1905–1980), Indian writer
- Nissim Kanekar (born 1973), Indian astrophysicist, cosmologist
- Shirish Kanekar (1943–2023), Indian writer and actor
