= Arnold W. Brunner Grant =

American architecture award

The Arnold W. Brunner Grant is awarded annually by the American Institute of Architects (AIA) New York Chapter, through the Center for Architecture Foundation, for advanced study in an area of architectural investigation "that will effectively contribute to the knowledge, teaching, or practice of the art and science of architecture."

Work supported by the grant has resulted in texts, research, projects, and films. Notable recipients include Peggy Deamer, Diana Agrest, Nathaniel Kahn, Paul Byard, Cervin Robinson, Carol Herselle Krinsky, Michael Sorkin, Thomas L. Schumacher, Anne Griswold Tyng, John Hejduk, and James Marston Fitch.
