= Sleeping Beauties: Reawakening Fashion =

High fashion art exhibition

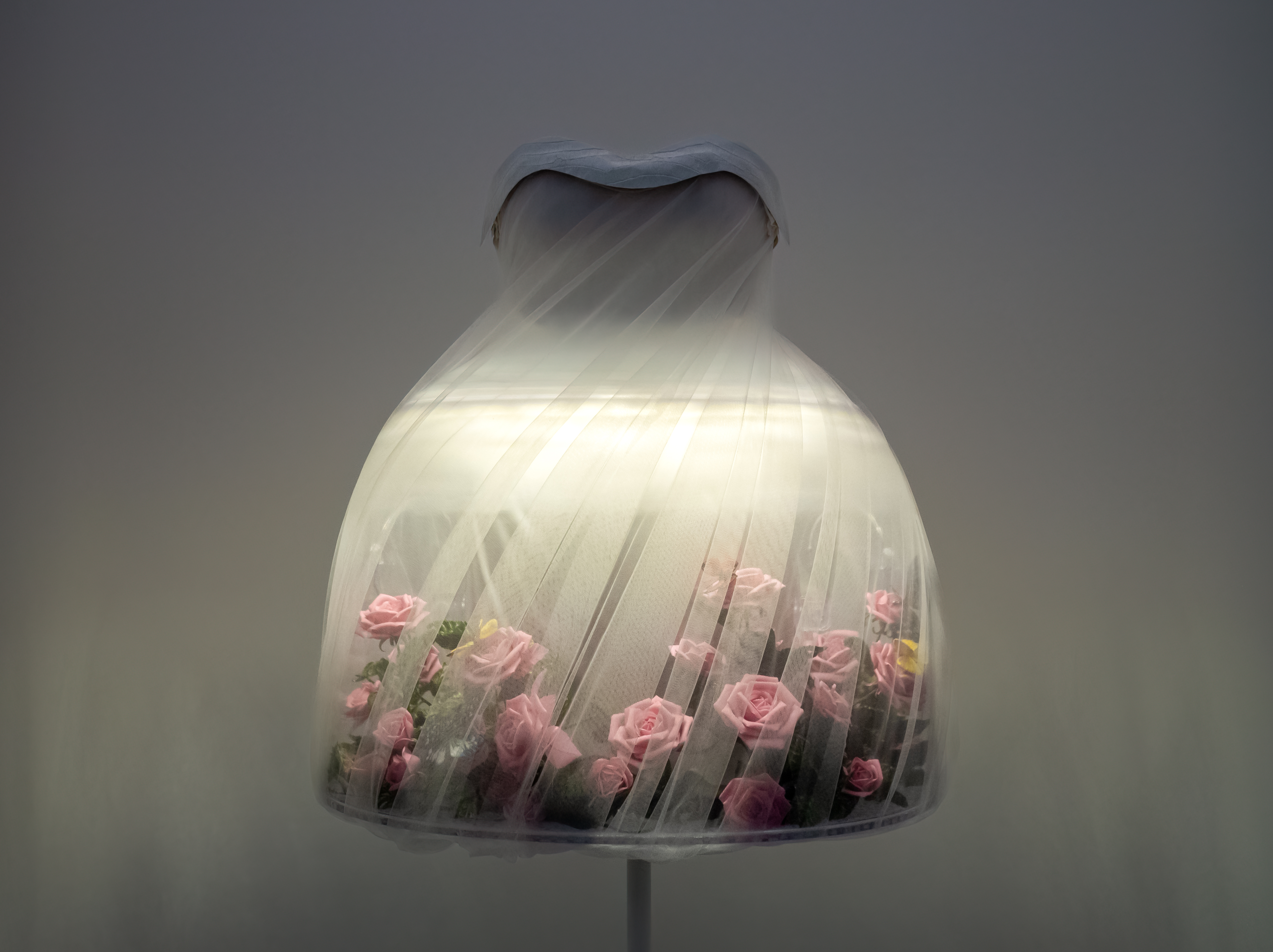
Dress by Jun Takahashi

Sleeping Beauties: Reawakening Fashion was the 2024 high fashion art exhibition of the Anna Wintour Costume Center, a wing of the Metropolitan Museum of Art (MMA) which houses the collection of the Costume Institute. The exhibition was announced on November 8, 2023. The exhibition was held at the museum from May 10 to September 2, 2024. It featured approximately 250 items from the permanent collection of the Costume Institute that were displayed using AI and CGI with themes of sea, land, and sky as a metaphor for the fragility and ephemerality of fashion and a vehicle to examine the cyclical themes of rebirth and renewal.

== Met Gala ==
The Costume Institute at the Metropolitan Museum of Art inaugurates its annual exhibition with a formal benefit dinner at The Costume Institute Benefit, also informally known as the Met Gala. The annual gala for the 2024 exhibition took place on May 6, 2024. The co-chairs for the event were Bad Bunny, Chris Hemsworth, Jennifer Lopez, Anna Wintour, and Zendaya. The dress code for the evening was "The Garden of Time" inspired by the short story of the same name by J. G. Ballard. Shou Zi Chew, chief executive officer of TikTok, and Jonathan Anderson, creative director of Loewe, served as honorary chairs of the event.

Co-chairs Zendaya and Bad Bunny, Tyla, Elle Fanning, Taylor Russell, Ariana Grande, Rebecca Ferguson, Kendall Jenner, Cardi B, Nicki Minaj, Greta Lee and Aya Nakamura were hailed as the best-dressed at the gala across multiple publications such as Vogue, Harper's Bazaar, Rolling Stone and The Washington Post.

The event received criticism across social media and numerous publications. Naomi May from Elle labelled the looks on the red carpet as "tired" and in need of "an injection of fresh blood and energy." A guest at the event stated "It was the most boring and least exciting gala than in years past" and attributed the dull night to a lack of star power.

In 2024, the Met Gala was the catalyst for the Blockout 2024 online social media campaign to block the accounts of celebrities who attended the event The appearance of attendees after recent university campus war protests related to the Gaza–Israel conflict and the ongoing Rafah offensive caused many to compare the celebrities to those in The Hunger Games.

== Exhibition design ==
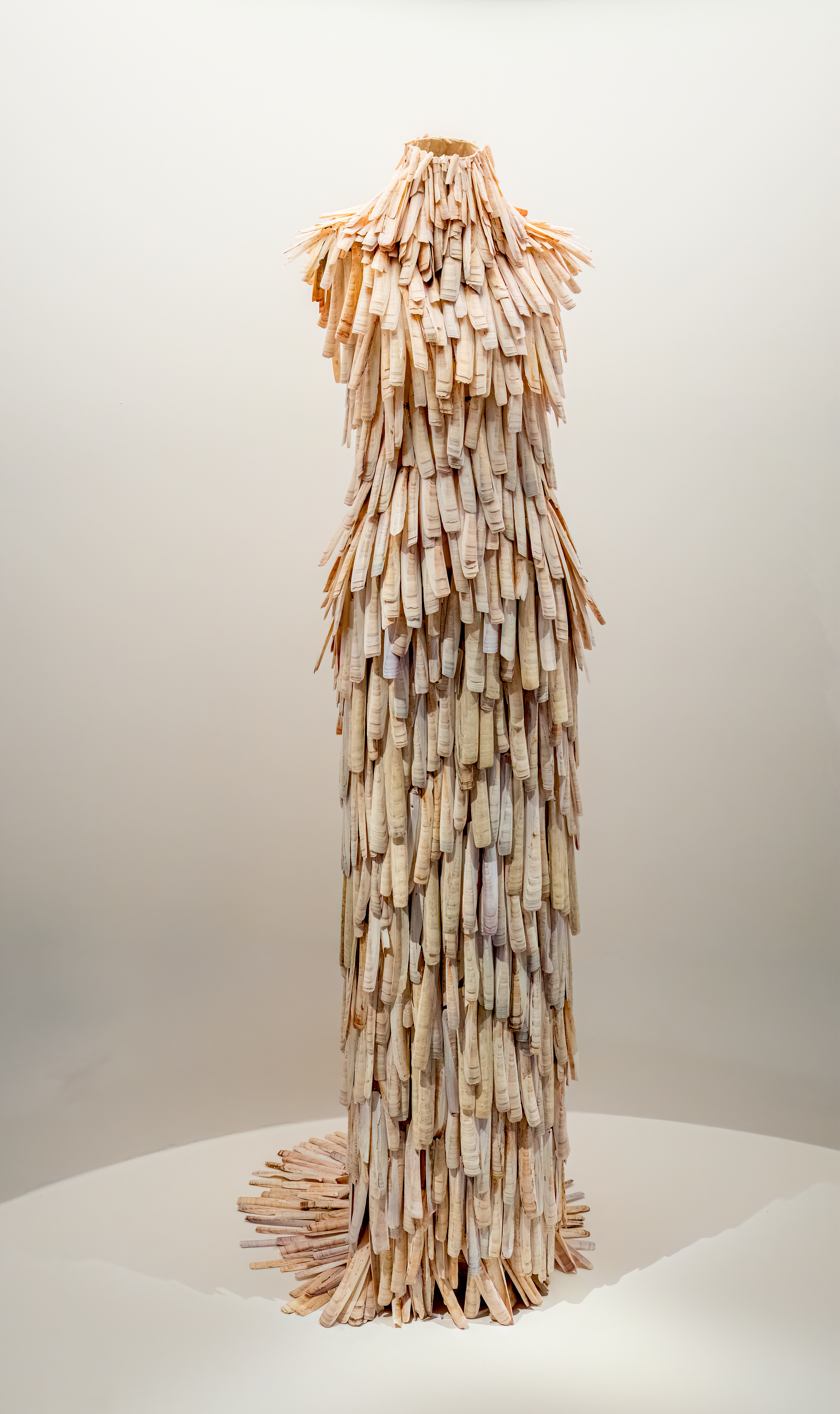
Clamshell dress by Alexander McQueen

The exhibition was curated by Andrew Bolton, the Curator in Charge of The Costume Institute since 2015. Photographer Nick Knight acted as the Creative Consultant for the exhibition, with Knight's own fashion communications company SHOWstudio developing various technological activations included in the exhibition. The exhibition design was constructed by architecture studio and design consultancy Leong Leong in collaboration with The Met’s Design Department. Researcher and artist Sissel Tolaas developed smells to accompany select objects in the show, to incorporate the exhibition's theming around decay.

The “Sleeping Beauties” that the exhibition is titled after are the garments themselves, with over 220 pieces dating from the 17th century to the fall 2024 collections displayed. This is the largest Costume Institute show in terms of objects composed exclusively of pieces already in the museum’s collection. The Costume Institute also made 75 new acquisitions for the exhibition. Many of the most fragile garments had to be displayed lying down inside glass boxes for preservation and to mimic the exhibition's theme or were reimagined through video animation. The exhibition included tactile 3D-printed plastic replicas, embroidery-embossed wallpaper, isolated recordings of pieces captured in an anechoic chamber, projections, scratch-and-sniff scents and other smell displays. The Costume Institute set up ChatGPT to allow visitors to "communicate" with socialite Natalie Porter, who wore the Callot Soeurs wedding ensemble that punctuates the show. The exhibition featured a Loewe overcoat that sprouted real grass, which had to be replaced by a new version every week because the grass could not survive that long without being watered.

Bolton commented on the exhibition's intentions: “When an item of clothing enters our collection, its status is changed irrevocably. What was once a vital part of a person’s lived experience is now a motionless ‘artwork’ that can no longer be worn or heard, touched, or smelled. The exhibition endeavors to animate these artworks by re-awakening their sensory capacities through a range of technologies, affording visitors sensorial ‘access’ to rare historical garments and rarefied contemporary fashions. By appealing to the widest possible range of human senses, the show aims to reconnect with the works on display as they were originally intended—with vibrancy, with dynamism, and ultimately with life.”

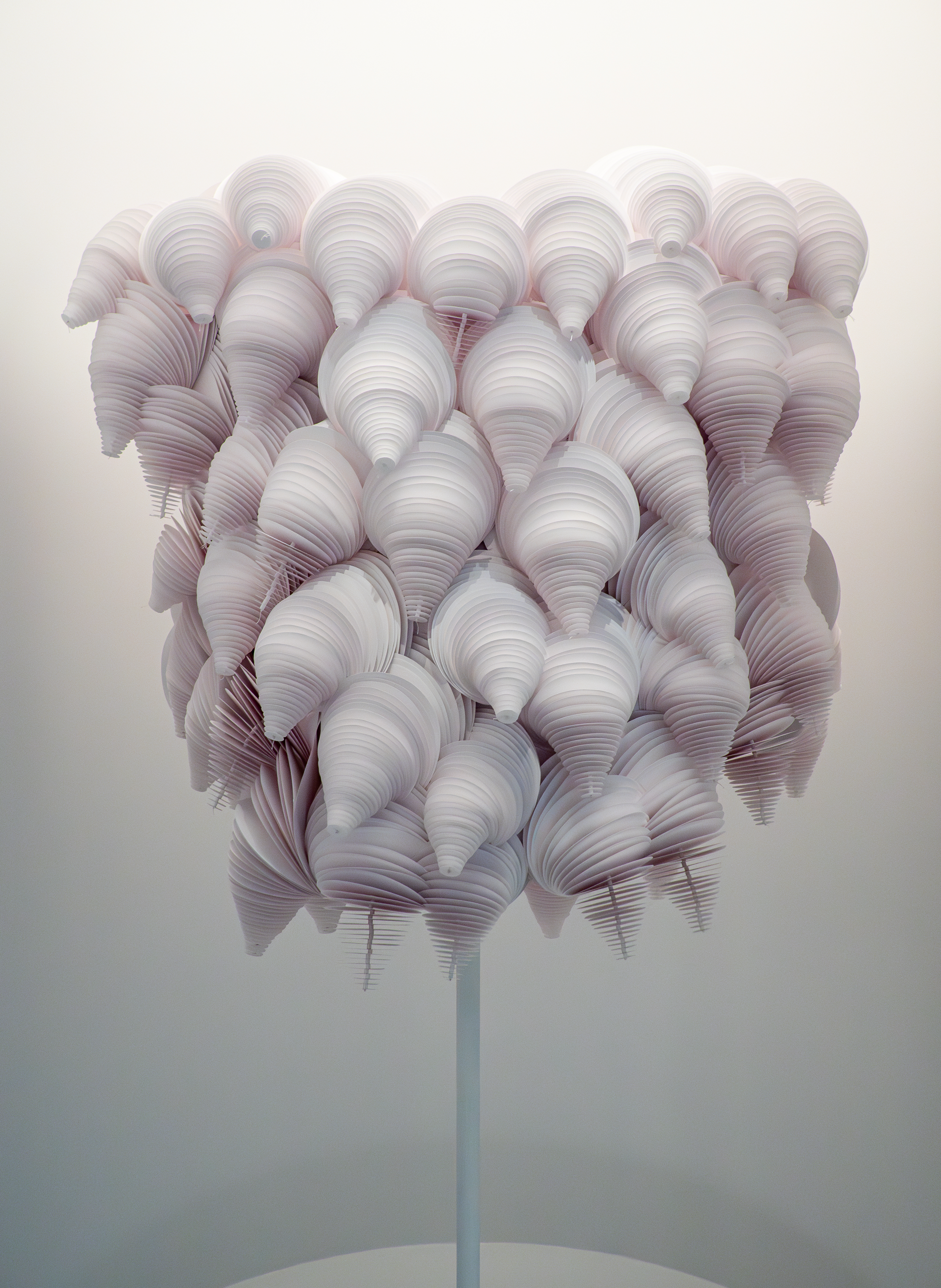
"Ammonite" dress by Bea Szenfeld

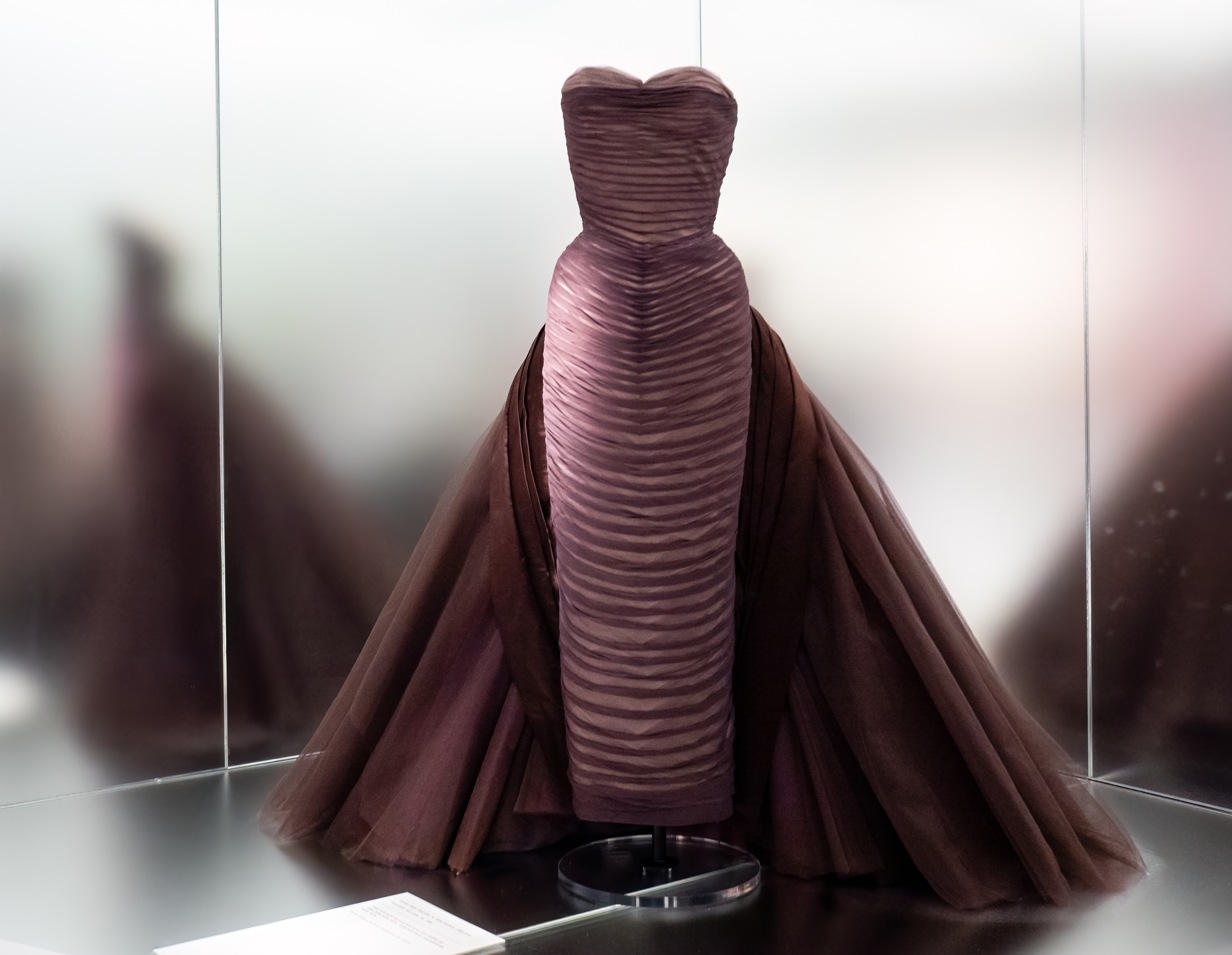
"Butterfly" ball gown by Charles James

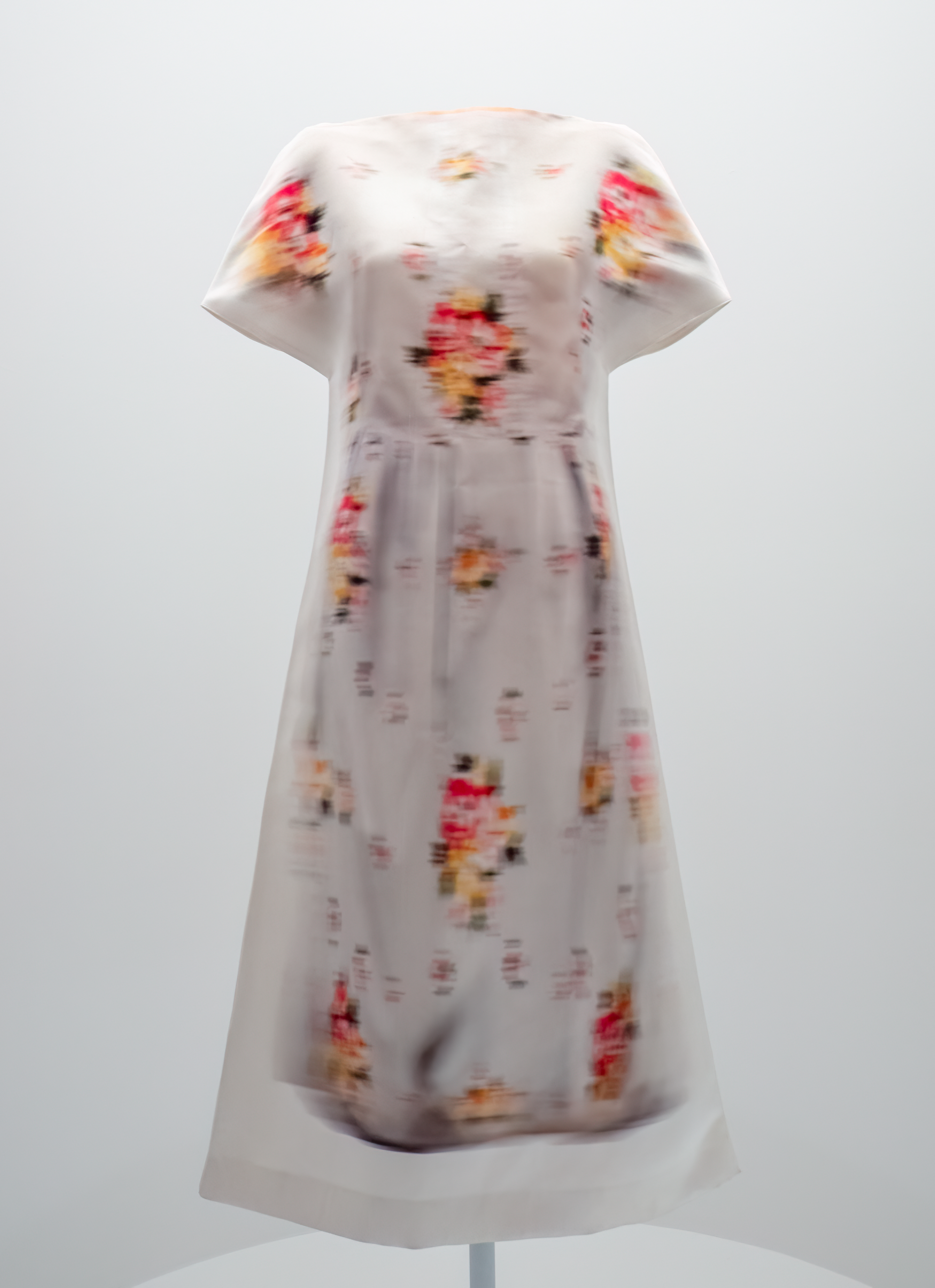
Dress by Joanathan Anderson for Loewe

Designers included in the exhibition:

- Jonathan Anderson
- Cristóbal Balenciaga
- Main Bocher
- Hattie Carnegie
- Paolo Carzana
- Lilly Daché
- Hubert de Givenchy
- Deirdre Hawken
- Stephen Jones
- Guy Laroche
- Madame Pauline
- Alexander McQueen
- Elsa Schiaparelli
- Sally Victor
- Vivienne Westwood

== Critical reception ==
The exhibition received mixed critical reviews from publications such as The New York Times, The Washington Post, The Wall Street Journal and The Guardian. Max Berlinger writing for The Guardian praised the exhibition as a "feast for the senses" and commended the exhibition's focus on decay, highlighting that fashion is the most human of design endeavours as it is dependent on its interaction with the human body. The Independent praised the exhibition for allowing visitors to build "an intimate connection" with the garments on display through its "innovative" methods.

Writing for The Washington Post, Rachel Tashjian hailed the exhibition as "well-intentioned" but "emphasizing a convoluted approach to technology" over the garments' wearers. The New York Times criticized the exhibition's use of technology, calling it more like "[a] fun house" and noted the sponsorship of TikTok.
