= Danteum =

Project for a monument to Dante Alighieri

The Danteum is an unbuilt monument proposed by a scholar of Dante, approved by the Benito Mussolini's Fascist government, designed by the modernist architect Giuseppe Terragni. However, in the end about all that remains now are some sketches on paper, scraps of an architectural model of the project and pieces of a project report (Relazione), written by Terragni.

The structure was meant to be built in Rome on the Via dell'Impero. The intention was to celebrate the famous Italian poet Dante and extol the virtues of a strong fascist state that bases its foundations on the glory of imperial Rome. The residues of the project give us the unfulfilled dream of Terragni for a monument to Dante, in which the Divine Comedy was projected in an architectural scheme.

== History ==
In 1938 Rino Valdameri, then director of the Brera Academy in Milan and president of the Società Dantesca Italiana (Italian Dante Society), had proposed to the Mussolini Cabinet to build, in time for the Universal Exposition of Rome E.42, a Danteum to celebrate the great poet. The project was commissioned by Valdameri to Terragni and Pietro Lingeri and was supported by steel industrialist milanese the count Alessandro Poss who had made available the sum of two million lire as a personal contribution to the project execution. Valdameri had also proposed a board of directors of twenty members to the nascent institution, made up of ministers, supporters and intellectuals, under the high supervision of the Head of government (Mussolini). The Valdameri himself had proposed some names for the board, including Giovanni Gentile and Ugo Ojetti.

November 10, 1938, at the Palazzo Venezia, the Valdameri and the designers present the project and they obtained the consent of the Duce. However, because of the political developments that led to the entrance into the war, the subsequent hearings to discuss the project, still they had been continuously postponed. At the very end the dream of the realization of the building dedicated to Dante Alighieri and the Divine Comedy, remained on paper.

== The project ==
Regarding the project papers, there are a few copies of the boards of the panels with bas-reliefs, that had been photographed and entered in the drawings, and the project report of Giuseppe Terragni.

Compositionally, the Danteum was conceived as an allegory of the Divine Comedy. It consists of a sequence of monumental spaces that parallel the narrator's journey from the "dark wood" through hell, purgatory, and paradise. Rather than attempting to illustrate the narrative, however, Terragni focuses on the text's form and rhyme structure, translating them into the language of carefully proportioned spaces and unadorned surfaces typical of Italian Rationalism.

Because of the complex of literary, artistic, and architectural meaning associated with the design, the theorist Aarati Kanekar regards it as exemplary of how a spatial structure can express a sophisticated poetic meaning without an explicit "vocabulary" of architectural symbols.

== Bibliography ==
- Thomas L. Schumacher, The Danteum, New York, Princeton Architectural Press, 1985
- Aarati Kanekar, "From Building to Poem and Back: The Danteum as a Study in the Projection of Meaning Across Symbolic Forms" in The Journal of Architecture volume 10 issue April 2, 2005 (RIBA & Routledge)
