= Douglas Darden =

American architectural designer

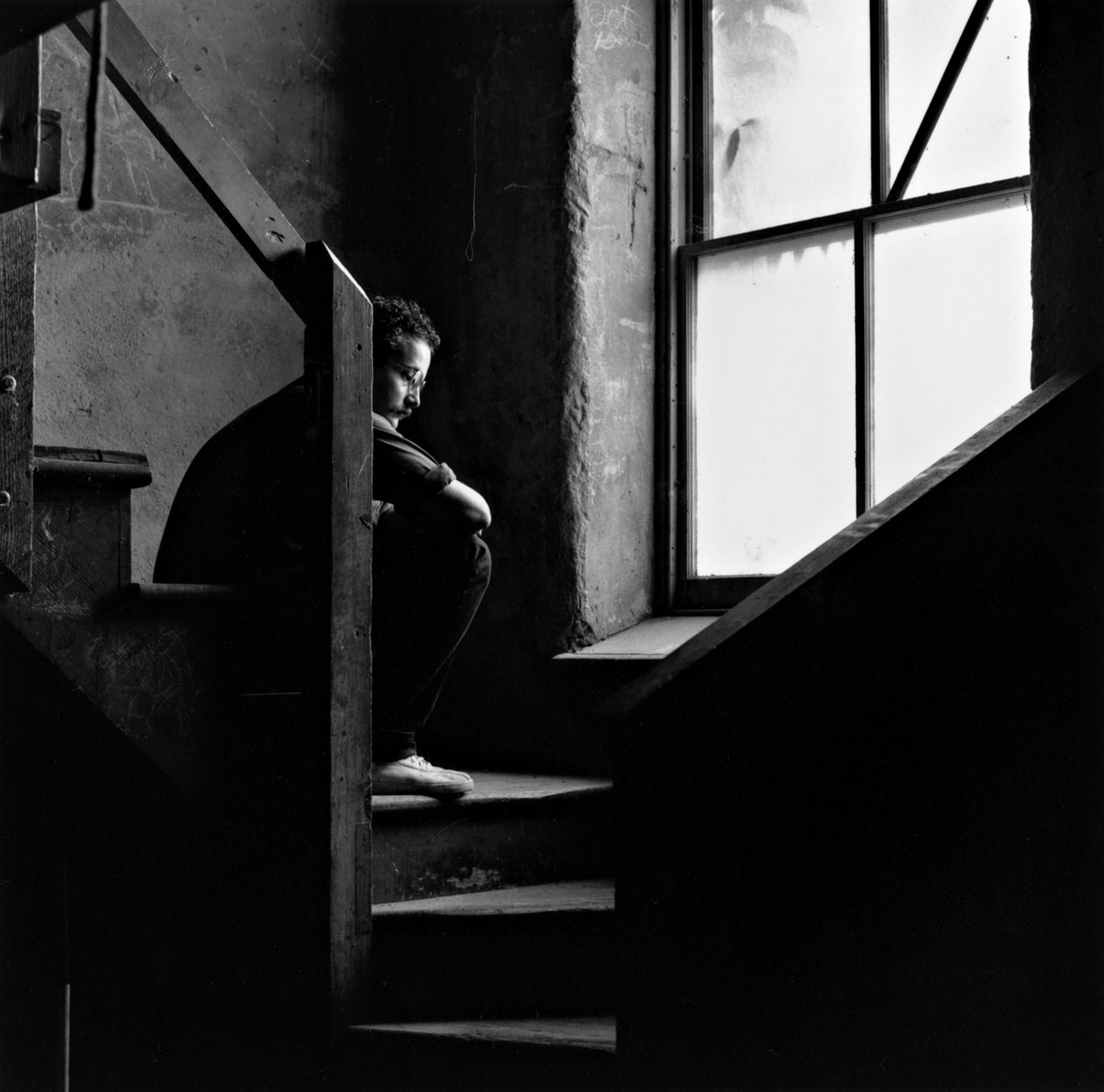
- Douglas Darden, Architect, 1984
- Born: Joseph Douglas Darden; October 20, 1951; Lakewood, Colorado, U.S.
- Died: April 3, 1996 (aged 44); Denver, Colorado, U.S.
- Occupations: Architectural Designer, Writer, Instructor

Signature
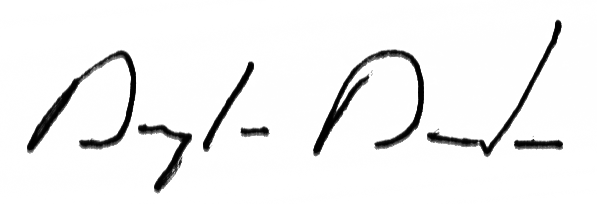

Joseph Douglas Darden (October 20, 1951 – April 3, 1996) was an American architectural designer, artist, writer, and instructor. He is most notable for his collection of visionary architecture published in his book, Condemned Building, in 1993. Darden died at the age of 44 in the spring of 1996 from leukemia.

== Biography ==
=== Early life and education ===
Darden was born in Lakewood, Colorado on October 20, 1951, to Joseph Darden and Nancy Lee Darden.

In the fall of 1969 he enrolled at the University of Colorado Boulder in Boulder, Colorado. He graduated in the spring of 1974 with his Bachelor of English and Psychology, Magna Cum Laude. He then attended Parsons School of Design in New York, New York from September 1977 to December 1978 on a design scholarship to study industrial design. Darden then went on to study architecture at Harvard Graduate School of Design in Cambridge, Massachusetts in the fall 1979, and graduated with his Master of Architecture, with distinction, in January 1983.

=== Career ===
While still attending the GSD, Darden became the chief studio instructor for the Architecture Career Discovery Program in 1982. After graduate school he became a visiting lecturer at the Catholic University of America in Washington D.C. for the spring semester 1984, teaching a graduate seminar on the American industrial landscape. From September 1984 until 1987 Darden taught architectural design as an adjunct assistant professor at Columbia University in New York, New York. From January 1987 until 1988 he taught architectural design as a special lecturer at the New Jersey Institute of Technology in Newark, New Jersey. In 1989 Darden moved back to his home state of Colorado to teach. He became a senior instructor at the University of Colorado Denver in the fall of 1990, teaching advanced-level architectural design studios and lecture courses. He continued to teach at the University of Colorado Denver until shortly before his death.

Beginning soon after the completion of his graduate studies at Harvard, Darden began writing and designing, publishing essays on architectural theory, as well as publishing theoretical architectural designs (which were later printed in Condemned Building), lecturing at various universities and conferences, and exhibiting various works in galleries and group shows (one notable exhibition was of his Museum of Impostors in the gallery Artists Space in the group show From Here to Eternity).

In the course of his career he was the recipient of several fellowships, honors, and awards. Some of the most distinguished are the Entering Professional Designer Project Fellowship from the National Endowment for the Arts in 1984 for his work Museum of Impostors; The Young Architects Forum winner (now Architectural League of New York) in 1985, also for Museum of Impostors; recipient of a traveling grant from the Graham Foundation in 1988 for Hostel; and a Fellowship at the American Academy in Rome in 1989, during which he developed Hostel, Temple Forgetful, and Confessional (see also List of Fellows of the American Academy in Rome). Darden was also listed as one of the leading fifty contemporary architects by Yoichi Iijima in 1993, along with Peter Eisenman, Frank Gehry, Lebbeus Woods, and Eric Owen Moss.

=== Later life and death ===
Darden was diagnosed with chronic myelogenous leukemia (CML) on February 12, 1990. Darden references this date in his letter from Burnden Abraham for the project Oxygen House, which is a house for dying in. He began chemotherapy, and after a few years began to go into remission, although his cancer was not cured.

In 1991–92 Robert Miller, having learned of Darden's illness, conducted a film interview—with grant monies from the Clemson University School of Architecture, and first screened at their Graduate Symposium—called Douglas Darden: Looking After the Underbelly in order to capture and preserve some of Darden's ideas.

Darden went into blast crisis—the final and terminal stage of CML—in late September 1995, just weeks after he married Allison Jo Rosen on September 16. On the morning of April 3, 1996, Darden died in Denver at the age of 44.

== Influences ==
The last year he attended the GSD Darden took a studio with Stanley Tigerman, in whose class he designed the project Saloon for Jesse James. It was Tigerman's radical approach to architecture that would significantly change Darden's own approach to architecture. Darden dedicates Condemned Building—in addition to his parents—to Tigerman.

Among the numerous drawings, sketches, and studies found after Darden's death was found a study for the frontispiece of Condemned Building. It was found in a box and drawn on yellow tracing paper. This study depicts four leaning books: Marcel Duchamp's La Boite Vert, Jean-Jacques Lequeu's Architecture Civile, Étienne-Louis Boullée's Treatise, and Giovanni Battista Piranesi's Le Carcieri. While this version of the frontispiece was not used for Condemned Building, those four artists/architects and the works contained within their respective helped inspire the frontispiece that was ultimately published in Condemned Building.

One notable work of visionary architecture that strongly influenced Darden was Giuseppe Terragni's Danteum, an unbuilt monument commissioned by Benito Mussolini for the Esposizione universale (1942). Inspired by and dedicated to Dante Alighieri, it was never built due to the outbreak of World War II. The project is meant to recreate Dante's Divine Comedy in architectural form. As a representation of narrative in architecture, it had a significant impact on Darden's thought. Darden wrote a review of Thomas L. Schumacher's Terragni's Danteum (Princeton Architectural Press, 1985), in which he comments: "...the Danteum does not 'illustrate' the Divine Comedy: Terragni's project is not a literal narrative that makes figures of space; instead it is an architectural poem..." The Danteum is a work of what Darden called "narrative architecture", which would become a significant aspect of how he approached his later works.

=== Pre-text, Con-texts, Sub-texts, and Archi-texts ===
Darden would use a number of terms that he himself devised to describe how a quote, image, sketch, et cetera might influence a project. He would use the term pre-texts to describe passages that "in-form" the initial portion of the design process, but simultaneously cloak and conceal the real intention. Con-texts are the writings by Darden or the inspirational elements that condition the design and give it a sense of believability. Sub-text was the underlying story behind the project—in a sense, Darden's own personal life found in the project (e.g., Darden's letter to The Southern Quarterly on how he related Oxygen House with his leukemia). Finally, there are archi-texts, which are writings, thoughts, or ideas by Darden himself that color the project and give it sustenance.

Of Darden's influences, literature was particularly important. Darden writes: "I wish to demonstrate that a work of literature could not only be a source of inspiration for an architectural project, but that a novel could more directly in-form architecture; that is, a novel could be the veritable client for a building design." After Darden's death a note of his was found in the project file box for Oxygen House that read: "Literature continues to create an agenda for representation which I deem to be pertinently as large as life. I wish architecture to have that same agenda, and literature has thus been my inspiration and, effectively, my sponsor."

Certainly one of the greatest influences on Darden was Herman Melville, and especially his magnum opus Moby-Dick. One of Darden's later projects was named after Herman Melville: Melvilla. Darden writes concerning this project: "The building honors Moby-Dick as the greatest novel in American history" Darden quotes an extensive passage from Chapter XLVII: "The Mat-Maker" from Moby-Dick in Condemned Building, and the passage is inscribed on rough-hewn stone on the side of the building. Darden also references another passage from Moby-Dick in the title image of Condemned Building: "How many, think ye, have likewise fallen into Plato's honey head and sweetly perished there?"; which comes from Chapter LXXVIII: "Cistern and Buckets".

Other literary works that influenced Darden's projects were William Faulkner's As I Lay Dying, the first chapter of which Darden quotes extensively in the letter from Burnden Abraham; Victor Hugo's The Hunchback of Notre-Dame, which is referenced in the project Temple Forgetful and quoted (Book V, Chapter II, "This Will Kill That") at the end of Condemned Building; the myth of Romulus and Remus, which influenced Temple Forgetful; Arthur Rimbaud's poem Le Bateau ivre, which is quoted extensively in the doctor-patient interview in Condemned Building, where it is noted that Darden and Rimbaud had the same birthday; the Marquis de Sade's Juliette and Justine, which were among the sources of inspiration for Sex Shop, along with the Biblical story of Adam and Eve; and William Shakespeare's Hamlet, passages from which can be found throughout Condemned Building.

=== Dis/continuous genealogies ===
For each of Darden's projects he would take a set of four images that were meaningful and inspiration for him concerning the project, and then overlay those four images into what he would call the ideogram, and that, in turn, would become the parti pris of sorts—i.e. the overall basis of the form of the architectural design. This process of compiling, overlaying, and deriving from inspirational images Darden called Dis/continuous Genealogy. The term originates with a friend of Darden's from The GSD, Ben Ledbetter, who termed a similar design process archaeologies; Darden said that it would be better termed "genealogies", and then later called it "Discontinuous Genealogy".

In some ways the Dis/continuous Genealogies are a pre-text (as Darden would term it), which in-forms the origins of the project, but also conceals its actual inspiration. The term itself is not unlike a term Duchamp used to "cover his tracks": archaeology of knowledge.

== The underbelly ==
Darden had a rather idiosyncratic term he used to describe the underside, substratum of architecture (and certainly this applied to anything in general), which he termed the underbelly. It was a term/idea that Darden himself did not feel could be fully defined, as he expresses in Douglas Darden: Looking After the Underbelly, but generally refers to the unknown and the unknowable, the unconventional, unexpected, improper, obscene, and ultimately the inverse of custom and tradition.

He writes a short piece of prose—entitled Dweller by the Dark Stream—on the "Contents" page of Condemned Building: "I am inclined while watching the turtle to turn it over and study its underbelly. From this unnatural position I see how this platonically solid creature makes its way through the world."

== Works ==
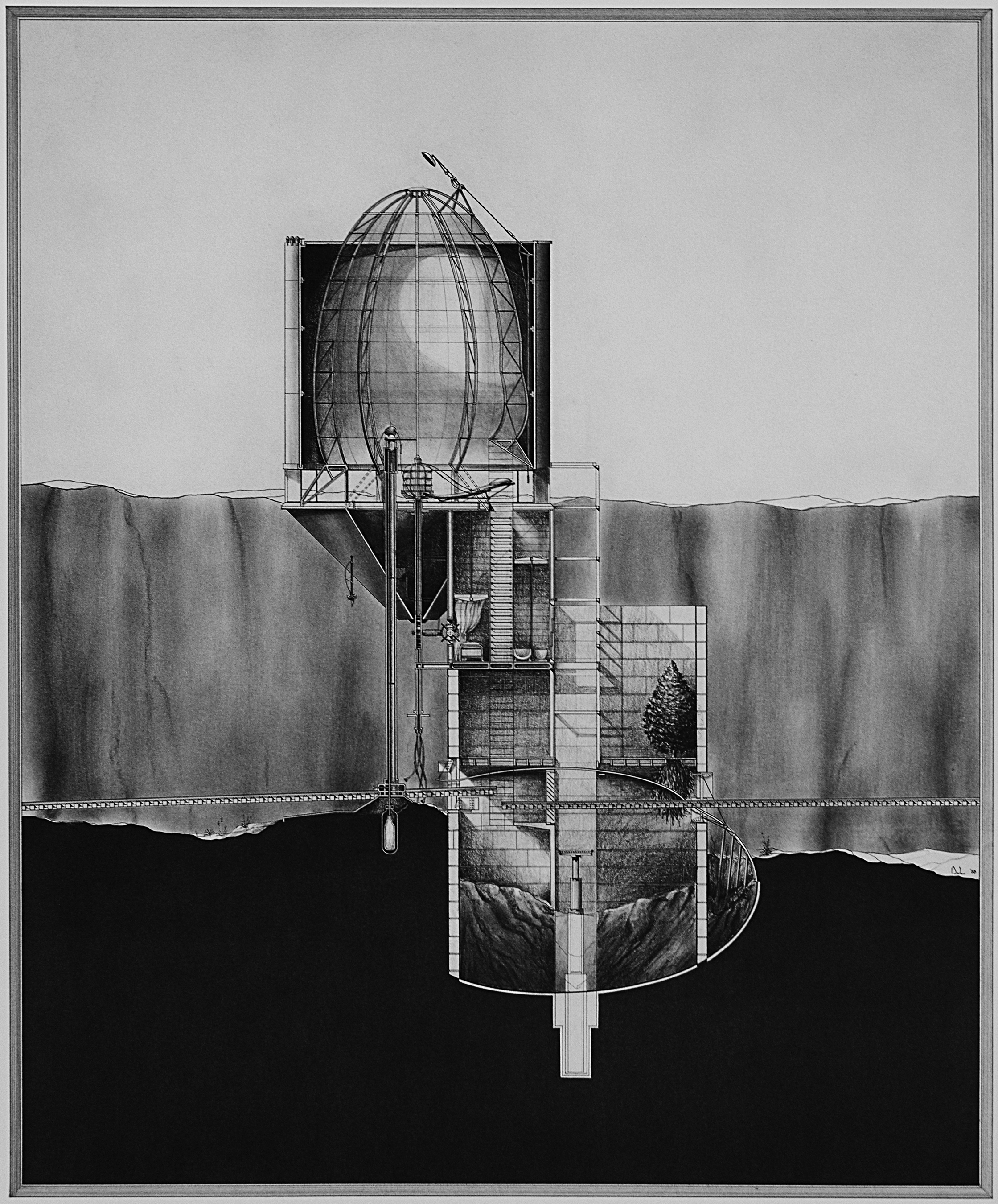
Oxygen House

=== Condemned Building ===
In 1993 Darden published his only book, entitled Condemned Building: An Architect's Pre-Text, which exhibits ten of his visionary architectural designs he had completed in prior years. These ten designs explore and attempt to understand architecture as it is commonly comprehended, but done so by overturning and inverting common notions and canons and studying, as Darden would call it, "architecture's underbelly". As is written in the "Forewords":

The ten works of architecture cited in this book were constructed from a particular canon of architecture that has persisted throughout the centuries and the varieties of architectural styles. The buildings are like a turning-over, one by one, of those canons. Like the action of the plow, this was done not to lay waste to the canons, but to cultivate their fullest growth.

The following are the projects with their respective canon and reversa.

Museum of Impostors	Architecture posits the ~~authentic~~.
	Architecture posits the fake.
Temple Forgetful	A monument is for ~~remembering~~.
	A monument is for forgetting.
Clinic for Sleep Disorders	Architecture ~~domesticates~~ our fears.
	Architecture locates our fears.
Night School	~~Light~~ is the revealer of form.
	Darkness is the revealer of form.
Melvilla	Architecture is the ~~reconciliation~~ with nature.
	Architecture is the irreconciliation with nature.
Hostel	Architecture ~~takes possession of a place~~.
	Architecture displaces.
A Saloon for Jesse James	Architecture is ~~accommodation~~.
	Architecture is confrontation.
Sex Shop	Architecture ~~fulfills~~ desire.
	Architecture objectifies desire.
Confessional	Man is ~~at the center~~ of divine creation.
	Man is off-center of divine creation.
Oxygen House	A house is for ~~living~~.
	A house is for dying.

Thus, for instance, in the project Oxygen House the canon used is: "A house is for ~~living~~"; its reversa is: "A house is for dying." This would most likely have come from Le Corbusier's infamous aphorism: "A house is a machine for living in." Darden overturns this canon and designs a house for a dying man—a fictitious character he named Burden Abraham—who suffered a collapsed lung from a railroad accident, and now must live in an oxygen tent for the rest of his life; the house would eventually become Abraham's tomb.

=== Laughing Girls ===
Around the time of working on producing Condemned Building Darden began to work on a new project with a former student of his, James Trewitt, entitled The Laughing Girls from Troy, New York, but was never completed due to Darden's untimely death. The project was meant to be an architectural graphic novel, in which they would "design and make sites, spaces, forms, objects, etc. as the narrative itself." That narrative was driven by laughter, and that laughter would become the process for architecture. The laughter was the laughter of three young girls, who were, in essence, their clients: the fourteen year-old twins, Cass and Polly, and their nineteen-year-old friend, Helen. Cass and Polly are most likely feminized renderings of the celestial twins of Greek mythology, Castor and Pollux (better known as Gemini), and their sister, Helen of Troy.

=== Remainder of works ===
Many of his original sketches and drawings for Oxygen House are now owned by the Museum of Modern Art, along with a select few of Sex Shop drawings; gifts of Darden's widow.

The remainder of his drawings are held at the Avery Architectural and Fine Arts Library at Columbia University, New York, New York, with the exception of a select few others, which remain in private collections, such as a couple of the final drawings for Temple Forgetful, which are held and displayed in the office of David Tryba Architects in Denver, Colorado.
