= Leong Leong =

Architectural and design firm

Leong Leong is an architecture studio and design consultancy in New York City. Founded in 2009 by brothers Dominic Leong and Chris Leong, the studio is known for material experimentation and integrating aesthetics with social practice.

== Projects ==
Notable Leong Leong projects include:

- Sleeping Beauties: Reawakening Fashion, the Spring 2024 Exhibition of The Metropolitan Museum of Art's Costume Institute. The design of the physical space features "a single snaking hallway widening into a series of round, domed rooms to create an immersive and episodic experience" for displaying approximately 250 garments and accessories spanning four centuries.
- The Los Angeles LGBT Center Anita May Rosenstein Campus, an intergenerational facility serving LGBT seniors and youth in Hollywood, California. The Campus is unprecedented in its size—183,700 square feet, or about 2 acres—and combination of social services with affordable housing.
- City View Garage in Miami, Florida, a parking garage that, because of its location at the edge of Miami's Design District, intricately designed titanium-coated panels, and visibility from the I-195 freeway, "acts as a kind of billboard for the [city's] Design District."
- U.S. Pavilion – 14th Venice Biennale in Venice, Italy.
- 3.1 Phillip Lim Flagship in Seoul, Korea. The quilted effect of the building's 40-foot façade is an example of Leong Leong "taking a familiar material such as concrete and casting it into a supple texture."
- Living in America: Frank Lloyd Wright, Harlem, and Modern Housing at the Temple Hoyne Buell Center for the Study of American Architecture in New York City, an exhibition "showing how two different approaches to housing—Frank Lloyd Wright's Broadacre City (1929–58) and New York City's first public housing developments (the Harlem River Houses, on which construction began in 1936)—combine societal aspiration with racial segregation and socioeconomic inequality."
- Sweetgreen, "the [fast casual restaurant] chain that made salads chic, modular and ecologically conscious," in New York City.
- Float Tank 01 for Architecture Effects, a joint initiative of the Guggenheim Bilbao in Bilbao, Spain and the Solomon R. Guggenheim Museum in New York City. Built from stainless steel and coated with insulating spray foam, Float Tank 01 is an "off-the-grid" solar furnace that can slowly heat water to maintain the optimum temperature and level of salinity for flotation. "Combining psychotropic functions and an ancient architectural typology, Leong Leong's prototype is an effective structure for reprogramming body and mind and exercising awareness."
- Courtyard Coalition, "a process-focused program that highlights MoMA PS1's Courtyard as a cultural and spatial asset for critical questions at the intersection of cultural institutions, civic space, and urban life" at MoMA PS1 in Queens, New York City.
- ONX Studio in New York City, a hybrid production and exhibition space for artists, filmmakers, and designers to work with mixed reality media.
- Everlane Flagships in New York City and San Francisco. The San Francisco-based retailer previously sold ethically made clothing basics almost exclusively online.

== Partners ==
Founding partners Chris and Dominic Leong were born 17 months apart in St. Helena, California.

After studies at the University of California, Berkeley and Princeton University School of Architecture (Chris) and California Polytechnic State University, San Luis Obispo and Columbia University Graduate School of Architecture, Planning and Preservation (Dominic), the brothers arrived in New York, where they founded Leong Leong in 2009.

Both brothers are involved in non-profit organizations and academia.

Dominic Leong is an Adjunct Assistant Professor at Columbia University Graduate School of Architecture, Planning and Preservation, an Adjunct Associate Professor at The Cooper Union for the Advancement of Science and Art, and was an invited lecturer at the Massachusetts Institute of Technology. He is also a co-founder of Hawaiʻi Nonlinear, a Honolulu-based non-profit organization "empowering Indigenous futures in the built environment through art and architecture."

Chris Leong is an Adjunct Assistant Professor at Columbia University Graduate School of Architecture, Planning and Preservation, and he has taught at Cornell University College of Architecture, Art, and Planning and the Massachusetts Institute of Technology. He is also on the board of Triple Canopy, a New York-based non-profit arts organization.

== Exhibitions ==
The following exhibitions have presented works by Leong Leong:

- Architecture Effects at the Guggenheim Bilbao in Spain, curated by Manuel Cirauqui, Curator, Guggenheim Museum Bilbao, and Troy Conrad Therrien, Curator of Architecture and Digital Initiatives, Solomon R. Guggenheim Museum (2018–2019)
- Unpacking the Cube at Chamber gallery in New York City, curated by Andrew Zuckerman (2016)
- Flow State, a collection of 23 in-progress and completed works produced over 13 years by Leong Leong (2022)
- Sharing Models: Manhattanisms at Storefront for Art and Architecture in New York City, curated by Eva Franch i Gilabert (2016)
- Soft Schindler at the MAK Center for Art and Architecture in West Hollywood, California, curated by Mimi Zeiger (2019–2020)
- The Library at the National Museum of Art in Oslo, Norway for the Oslo Architecture Triennale 2019: "Enough: The Architecture of Degrowth"
- No-Thing: An Exploration into Aporetic Architectural Furniture at Friedman Benda in New York City, curated by Juan García Mosqueda (2018)

== Awards and honors ==
Leong Leong has been recognized with awards and honors from the Architectural League of New York, the American Institute of Architects, Architectural Record, Architizer, Dezeen, and The Architect's Newspaper.
