= Jeremiah Sirles =

American football player (born 1991)

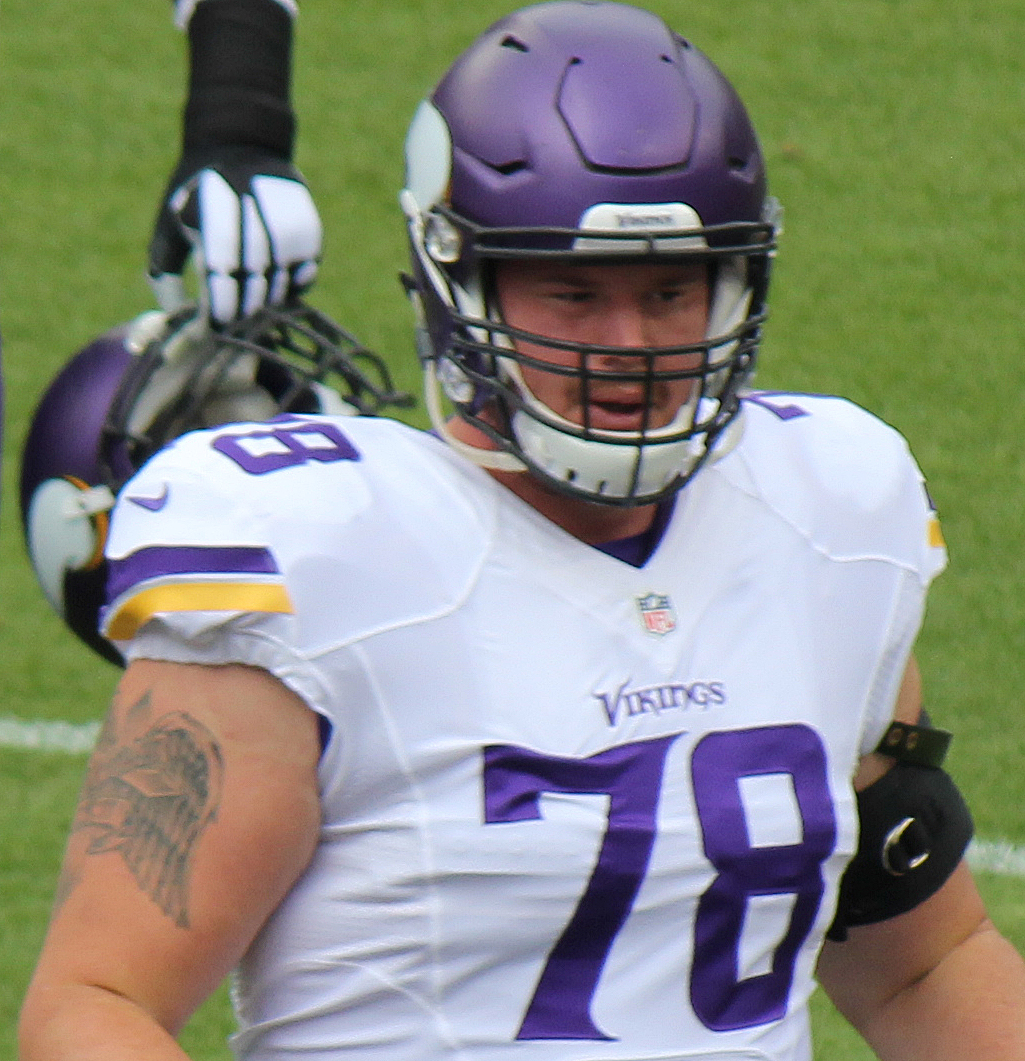
- Sirles with the Minnesota Vikings in 2017

No. 75, 78, 74
- Position: Guard

Personal information
- Born: August 8, 1991 (age 35); Lakewood, Colorado, U.S.
- Listed height: 6 ft 6 in (1.98 m)
- Listed weight: 315 lb (143 kg)

Career information
- High school: Bear Creek (Lakewood)
- College: Nebraska (2009–2013)
- NFL draft: 2014: undrafted

Career history
- San Diego Chargers (2014); Minnesota Vikings (2015–2017); Carolina Panthers (2018)*; Buffalo Bills (2018)
- * Offseason or practice squad member only

Awards and highlights
- Second-team All-Big Ten (2012)

Career NFL statistics
- Games played: 42
- Games started: 20
- Stats at Pro Football Reference

Jeremiah Sirles (born August 8, 1991) is an American former professional football player who was a guard in the National Football League (NFL). He played college football for the Nebraska Cornhuskers. He was a member of the San Diego Chargers, Minnesota Vikings, Carolina Panthers, and Buffalo Bills.

== Early life ==
Sirles played high school football for the Bear Creek High School Bears of Lakewood, Colorado. He was named to the Rocky Mountain News' All-Colorado squad his junior and senior years. He also earned first-team All-Colorado and all-conference honors as a junior, helping his team reach the state quarterfinals. As a sophomore, Sirles helped Bear Creek reach the state quarterfinals, garnering first-team All-South Metro League and second-team all-state honors. He also participated in basketball and track & field at Bear Creek, helping his basketball team to the state tournament in his senior year.

== College career ==
Sirles played for the Cornhuskers at the University of Nebraska–Lincoln from 2010 to 2013. He was redshirted in 2009. He played in 53 games, starting 41 for the Cornhuskers. He was the 2013 recipient of the Cornhuskers' Guy Chamberlin Award. Sirles also earned honorable mention All-Big Ten honors as a senior and second-team All-Big Ten as a junior, along with Academic All-Big Ten honors his senior year.

== Professional career ==
Pre-draft measurables
Height	Weight	40-yard dash	10-yard split	20-yard split	20-yard shuttle	Three-cone drill	Vertical jump	Broad jump	Bench press
6 ft 6 5/8 in (2.00 m)	308 lb (140 kg)	5.37 s	1.91 s	3.06 s	4.86 s	7.63 s	26 in (0.66 m)	8 ft 6 in (2.59 m)	21 reps
All values from Nebraska Pro Day

=== San Diego Chargers ===
Sirles signed with the San Diego Chargers on May 10, 2014, after going undrafted in the 2014 NFL draft. He was signed to the Chargers' practice squad on August 31, 2014. He was promoted to the active roster on November 29, 2014. Sirles made his NFL debut on December 20, 2014, against the San Francisco 49ers filling in as guard for an injured Johnnie Troutman. He made his first career start at right guard on December 28, 2014, against the Kansas City Chiefs.

=== Minnesota Vikings ===
Sirles was traded to the Minnesota Vikings on September 5, 2015, for a sixth-round pick in the 2016 NFL draft.

In the 22–10 upset at Carolina in Week 3 of the 2016 season, Sirles played the final 39 minutes at left guard when Alex Boone went down because of a hip injury. The following week, Sirles stepped in at right tackle after Andre Smith went down with an elbow injury with eight minutes left in the first quarter. With Sirles on the field for the final 52 minutes, the Vikings scored 24 points, did not give up a sack, surpassed 100 yards rushing and scored their first two rushing touchdowns of the season. A week later, Sirles made his first start at right tackle in the Vikings' 31–13 win over the Houston Texans. He was the highest graded Viking offensive lineman in the game according to Pro Football Focus.

In 2017, Sirles played in 14 games as a backup guard and center, where he started four games in place of injured starters Nick Easton and Pat Elflein.

=== Carolina Panthers ===
On March 23, 2018, Sirles signed a one-year contract with the Carolina Panthers, reuniting with former Vikings offensive coordinator Norv Turner. He was placed on injured reserve on September 1. Sirles was released by Carolina on September 6.

=== Buffalo Bills ===
On September 25, 2018, Sirles was signed by the Buffalo Bills.

On January 16, 2019, Sirles signed a one-year contract extension with the Bills. He was placed on injured reserve on July 23, with a foot injury. Sirles was released by Buffalo on July 31.

Sirles announced his retirement from football on March 2, 2020.
