= Aarati Kanekar =

Indian architect

- Education: CEPT University, MIT, Georgia Institute of Technology
- Occupations: Architect, Academic, Researcher
- Notable work: Architecture’s Pre-texts: Spaces of Translation

Aarati Kanekar is an Indian academic, writer, researcher, and architect.

== Biography ==
Aarati Kanekar graduated in Architecture at the "Center for Environmental Planning and Technology" in Ahmedabad in India in 1989, she completed her graduate studies from the Massachusetts Institute of Technology in 1992, and holds a Ph.D. from Georgia Institute of Technology in Atlanta, currently teaches architectural theory and design at University of Cincinnati. Her research focuses on the themes of the design formulation, in particular representation and spatial construction of meaning and morphological studies in architecture. This research is reflected in her publications on topics ranging from the issues of representation in the work of Lebbeus Woods, to Danteum of Giuseppe Terragni and translations of the Divine Comedy through media, to spatiality in the novels of Italo Calvino and game design.

Kanekar worked at the architect's studio Balkrishna Vithaldas Doshi in India on large institutional projects and later collaborated with The National Institute of Design (NID) in Ahmedabad on conservation projects and tourism development in South India. She has also worked on post-war reconstruction and conservation projects in Mostar in Bosnia and Herzegovina.

== Works ==
=== Articles ===
Her writings are published in various journals, including The Journal of Architecture, Perspecta, Philosophica, and Domus.

- Between Drawing and Building, The Journal of Architecture, volume 15, issue 6 December 2010 (RIBA & Routledge) pp. 771–794.
- From Building to Poem and Back: The Danteum as a Study in the Projection of Meaning Across Symbolic Forms in The Journal of Architecture, volume 10, issue 2 April 2005 (RIBA & Routledge) pp. 135–159.
- Diagram and Metaphor in Design: The Divine Comedy as a Spatial Model, in Special Issue of the Journal PHILOSOPHICA 2002:
- Diagrams and the Anthropology of Space, edited by Kenneth J. Knoespel, volume 69 (1) 2002 Vakgroep Wijsbegeerte en Moraalwetenschap (Ghent University, Belgium) pp. 37–58.
- Metaphor in Morphic Language. Proceedings of the 3rd International Space Syntax Symposium, Atlanta, 2001. pp. 22.1-22.16.
- Shaping of Settlements: Temporal Events and Spatial Form in South Indian Temple Cities. Proceedings of the ACSA International Conference 2000, Hong Kong. pp. 293–299.

=== Books and publications ===
- Architecture’s Pre-texts: Spaces of Translation, Routledge, London, 2015 ISBN 9781315749723
- Fictional sites of architecture/architectural sites of fiction, in Sophia Psarra, The Production Sites of Architecture, Routledge, 2019, eBook ISBN 9780203712702
