= Bea Szenfeld =

Swedish designer

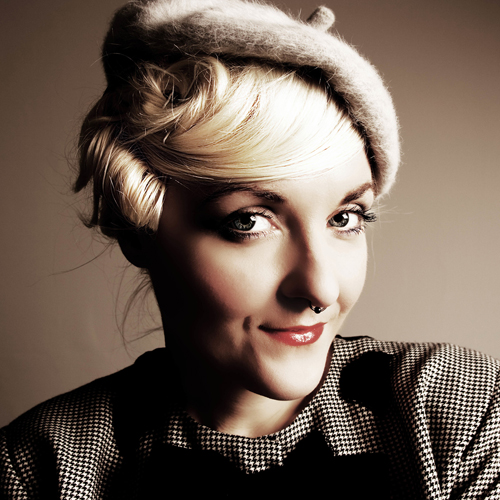
- Born: Beata Szenfeld; 23 December 1972 (age 52); Poland
- Citizenship: Swedish
- Occupation(s): Designer, fashion designer

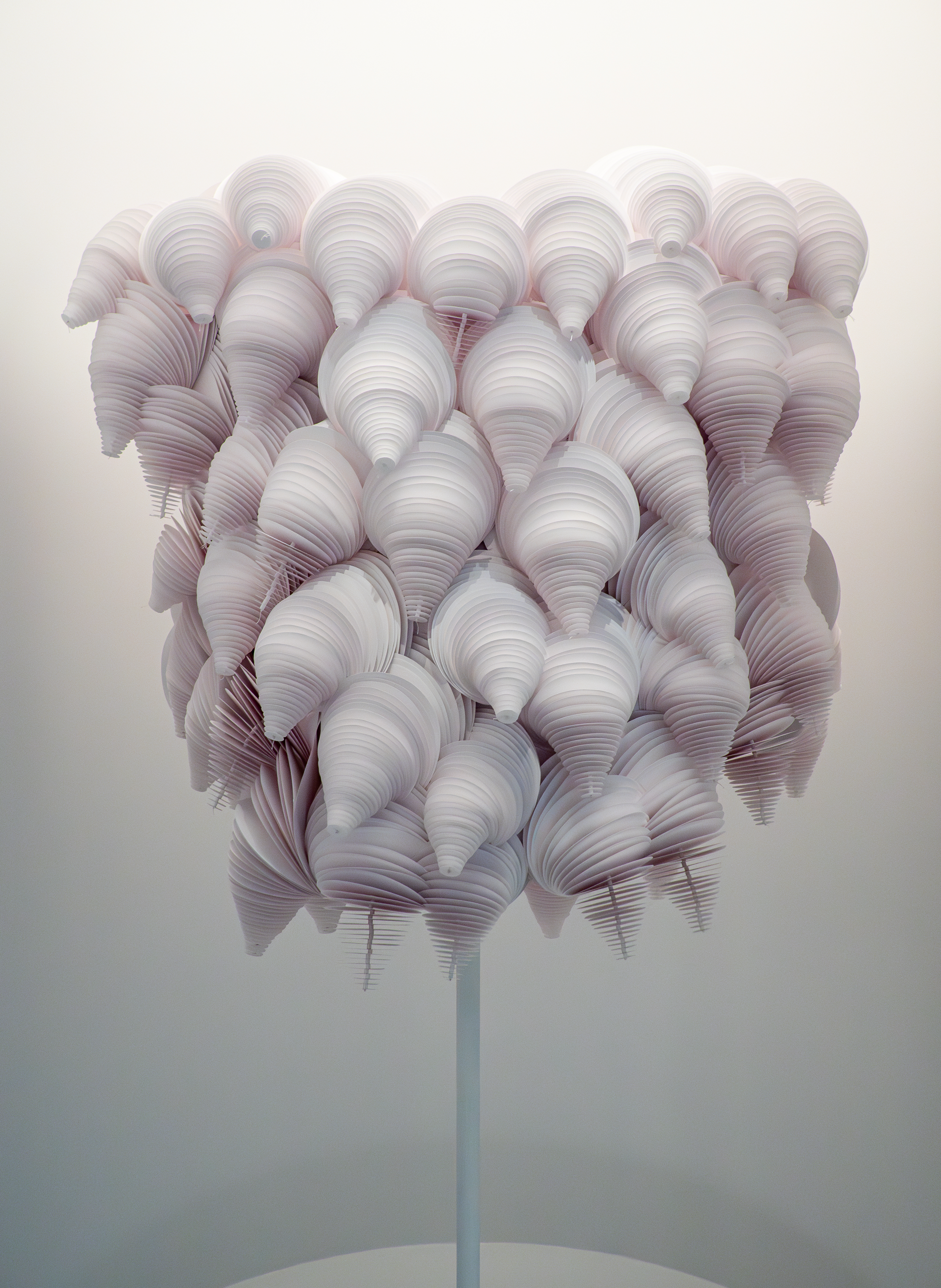
"Ammonite" dress featured in the Sleeping Beauties: Reawakening Fashion exhibition at the Metropolitan Museum of Art

Beata "Bea" Szenfeld (born 23 December 1972 in Poland) is a Polish-born Swedish designer and fashion designer. She is known for her artistic and experimental creations with unusual fabrics and contexts. She has also designed invitations and held exhibitions with art work.

== Biography ==
Szenfeld was born in Poland and moved as an 11-year-old child with her mother to Gothenburg, Sweden in 1983. She nowadays lives in Stockholm. In 2002, she graduated from Beckmans design school. Her graduation work won H&M's design scholarship.

After her graduation, she started her own brand in her name to design for both women and men. She often uses old fabrics or fabrics from secondhand clothes. In her vintage collection this is the most visible. She designs shirts with plenty of its original look remaining, but leaves them inside out or with the back of the t-shirt in the front. She reconstructs with the help of in-stitchings, bleaching, colouring and application sewings to create her clothes.

In 2003, Szenfeld won the TV3 design competition Fashion House, in which five Swedes lived in Rome for two months competing against other young European designers about a three months internship at the fashion house of Stella McCartney.

In 2005, she created her own exhibition called Too much is never enough, which had the theme of re-usable items. The exhibition was shown for the public at Kulturen i Lund, Regionmuseet Kristianstad and Falkenbergs museum. During Stockholm Fashion Week in August 2006 Szenfeld produced a joint fashion show with Gunilla Pontén. The same year, she was awarded a scholarship by the Konstnärsnämnden for the paper collection Paper Dolls which was exhibited at Liljevalchs konsthall in 2007.

When the American fashion designer Tommy Hilfiger visited Sweden in 2007, she designed the storefront for his store. She co-operated with the Japanese company Sanrio, which created Hello Kitty. Szenfeld has also designed constructively the invitations for the party planner Micael Bindefeld. When she cooperated with the Italian company Barilla, she designed a dress made entirely of pasta. In May 2009 Szenfeld presented the outdoors exhibition Träditioner at Kulturen i Lund, an interpretation of the national costume traditions montaged around trees in the culture park in Lund.

Szenfeld has designed stage clothes for several singers like Loreen and Ola Salo. During the 2010 Polar awards in Stockholm musician Björk Guðmundsdóttir wore one of Szenfelds creations. In 2013, she did charity work for the store chain Granit with unusual design of storage boxes, with all proceeds going to the children's help organization Happy Children. In 2014, singer, Lady Gaga used Szenfelds design for herself and her background dancers for the music video for the song "G.U.Y."

On 12 February 2020, Szenfelds studio was shot at when she was there, with a soft airgun with two people being arrested.
