= Abruzzo Bodziak Architects =

Abruzzo Bodziak Architects is an architecture firm in Brooklyn, New York City, which was founded in 2009 by Emily Abruzzo and Gerald Bodziak, who first met as graduate students at the Princeton University School of Architecture. Abruzzo Bodziak's work is known for a focus on contextually, use of light and color, and for material experimentation and graphic articulation.

The firm's work is divided into "projects" (built works) and "investigations" (research-based initiatives and speculative proposals). The cross-pollination between the two is evident in projects such as Fitnation, a traveling exhibit that began at the New York Center for Architecture highlighting architectural projects that support health and wellness, for which Abruzzo and Bodziak served as both curators and designers. The office's projects include civic buildings and cultural spaces, houses, installations, innovative educational spaces and urban design. The firm's investigations have focused on topics such as homelessness, unmeasurability in building, data-driven urban design, and new forms of housing. Projects such as "Storefront Library," completed in 2018 for Storefront for Art and Architecture combine the firm's interest in cultural programming with their investment in civic space.

== Recognition ==
- Groundbreakers Award, Curbed
- Design Vanguard, Architectural Record
- Arnold W. Brunner Grant, (4D Lightful Gardens), American Institute of Architects New York
- AIANY Design Award, Merit Award, Projects (Landscape (Triptych)), American Institute of Architects New York
- AIA New Practices New York, American Institute of Architects New York
- The Architectural League Prize, Architectural League of New York
