= Eva Franch i Gilabert =

Spanish architect, curator, and educator

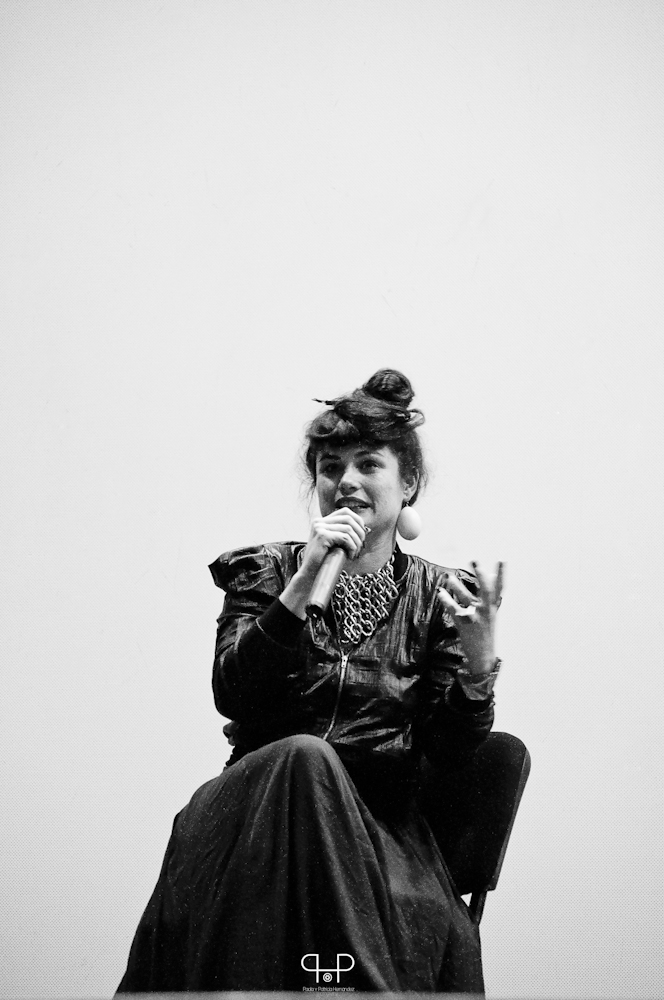
- Born: 10 December 1978 (age 47); Deltebre, Catalonia
- Education: UPC Universitat Politècnica de Catalunya; Princeton University
- Occupation: Architect
- Practice: OOAA—Office Of Architectural Affairs; Storefront for Art and Architecture; Architectural Association School of Architecture

Eva Franch i Gilabert (Deltebre, 10 December 1978) is a Catalan architect, curator, critic and educator based in New York City who works in the fields of contemporary art, architecture, and public space. She was executive director and chief curator of Storefront for Art and Architecture in New York from 2010 to 2018, then became the first female permanent director of the Architectural Association in London.

== Early life and education ==
Eva Franch i Gilabert grew up in Deltebre, a town 100 miles (161 kilometres) southwest of Barcelona in Catalonia, working in her mother's hair salon before leaving to study architecture in Barcelona and Delft. It is said a potential career as a figure skater had been cut short by injury at the age of 17, after which Franch studied architecture.

Franch holds master’s degrees in architecture with honors from both ETSA Barcelona (2003, UPC Universitat Politècnica de Catalunya), and Princeton University (2007). She also studied at the School of Fine Arts and the School of Philosophy in Barcelona/UB, and at TU Delft as part of the European Erasmus Exchange Programme.

== Career ==
During her studies Franch worked in the Catedra Gaudi, a research center dedicated to the architect Antoni Gaudi. Aged 22, Franch had a three-month internship in a Rotterdam-based firm, working on public buildings, masterplanning and social housing, after which she became a full-time employee heading the competitions team. She then moved to Barcelona and founded OOAA, Office Of Architectural Affairs. Aged 24, she obtained a La Caixa full fellowship to study in the United States and went to Princeton. She was then awarded a Reyner Banham Fellowship that enabled her to teach and develop new research in Buffalo, and a Wortham Fellowship at Rice University in Houston, Texas where she led the Ecologies of Excess research unit and was also the coordinator of its masters thesis program.

=== Storefront for Art and Architecture (2010-2018) ===
In 2010, Franch became the executive director and chief curator of Storefront for Art and Architecture in New York City where she presented more than 30 exhibitions and a series of public events and debates that catalyzed the art and architecture community for almost a decade around spatial issues addressing the relation between politics, representation, and aesthetics. Under her tenure Storefront gained an international presence with a series of innovative curatorial projects and initiatives including the World Wide Storefront, the Storefront International Series, Letters to the Mayor, the Competition of Competitions, and the Storefront TV. In 2018, Franch launched the New York Architecture Book Fair. The Letters to the Mayor project launched in 2014 invites architects to write letters to their city mayors as a way to open up dialogue about the making of cities and public life. The project has had more than twenty editions globally including New York, Mexico City, Buenos Aires, Athens, Taipei, Madrid and Rotterdam.

Franch curated international projects including Borders, the 2011 Think Space biennial concept competition program, and OUT, the 2014 Arquia Proxima biennial competition.

Franch, together with a curatorial and design team including Ana Miljacki, Ashley Schafer, Natasha Jen, Carlos Minguez Carrasco, Lars Müller, and architects Leong Leong among more than 300 collaborators, was selected by the US State Department to represent the United States at the XIV Venice Architecture Biennale (2014) with the project OfficeUS, an experiment for the making of new histories and global architecture practice.

At Storefront, she collaborated with hundreds of artists and architects including both prominent and emerging voices such as Vito Acconci, Alon Schwabe and Daniel Fernandez-Pascual (Cooking Sections), Matilde Cassani, Amie Siegel, Andres Jaque - Office for Political Innovation, Agnieska Kurant, Lan Tuazon, Gary Husbit, Frida Escobedo, Anna Puigjaner (MAIO) and Jing Liu and Florian Idenburg (So-IL), among many others.

Selected exhibitions curated by Franch included:

- Strategies for Public Occupation (2011), a creative response to the Occupy Wall Street movement in New York.
- Past Futures, Present, Futures (2012), revisiting relevant ideas from 100 visionary projects from New York city’s unbuilt history and projecting them with contemporary architects and artists to the future;
- Aesthetics-Anesthetics (2012), denouncing the rendering culture in architecture;
- POP: Protocols, Obsessions, Positions (2013), reflecting on the political dimension of architecture drawings;
- No Shame: Storefront for Sale (2013), investigating contemporary funding strategies for museums, public spaces and cultural production;
- Measure (2015), investigating ideas of value;
- Work in Progress (2016), addressing the economies and architectures of the construction boom in New York City;
- Sharing Models: Manhattanisms (2016), in response to the rise of the sharing movement;
- New New York Icons (2017), exploring issues of value and image-making through newly commissioned souvenirs for the city to be voted by the public;
- Architecture books: Yet to be Written (2018), exploring through book-making issues of the canon, invisibility and decolonization.

In 2018 Franch commissioned "Marching On: the Politics of Performance" by Bryony Roberts and Mabel Wilson presented as part of Performa addressing issues of race and politics. The same year, Franch launched the "New York Architecture Book Fair" in partnership with the New York Public Library, E-Flux, the Cooper Union, GSAPP, Printed Matter and small bookstores throughout New York City.

Throughout her tenure, Franch expanded Storefont’s footprint in Kenmare Street in SoHo with two additional spaces for operations and the indexing and digitization of the Storefront Archive. The Digital Archive project, directed by Chialin Chow, started in 2015 and was finalized and launched in December 2019.

In March 2018, while at Storefront, Franch was appointed Distinguished Professor of Shanghai Academy of Fine Arts.

=== Architectural Association (2018-2020) ===
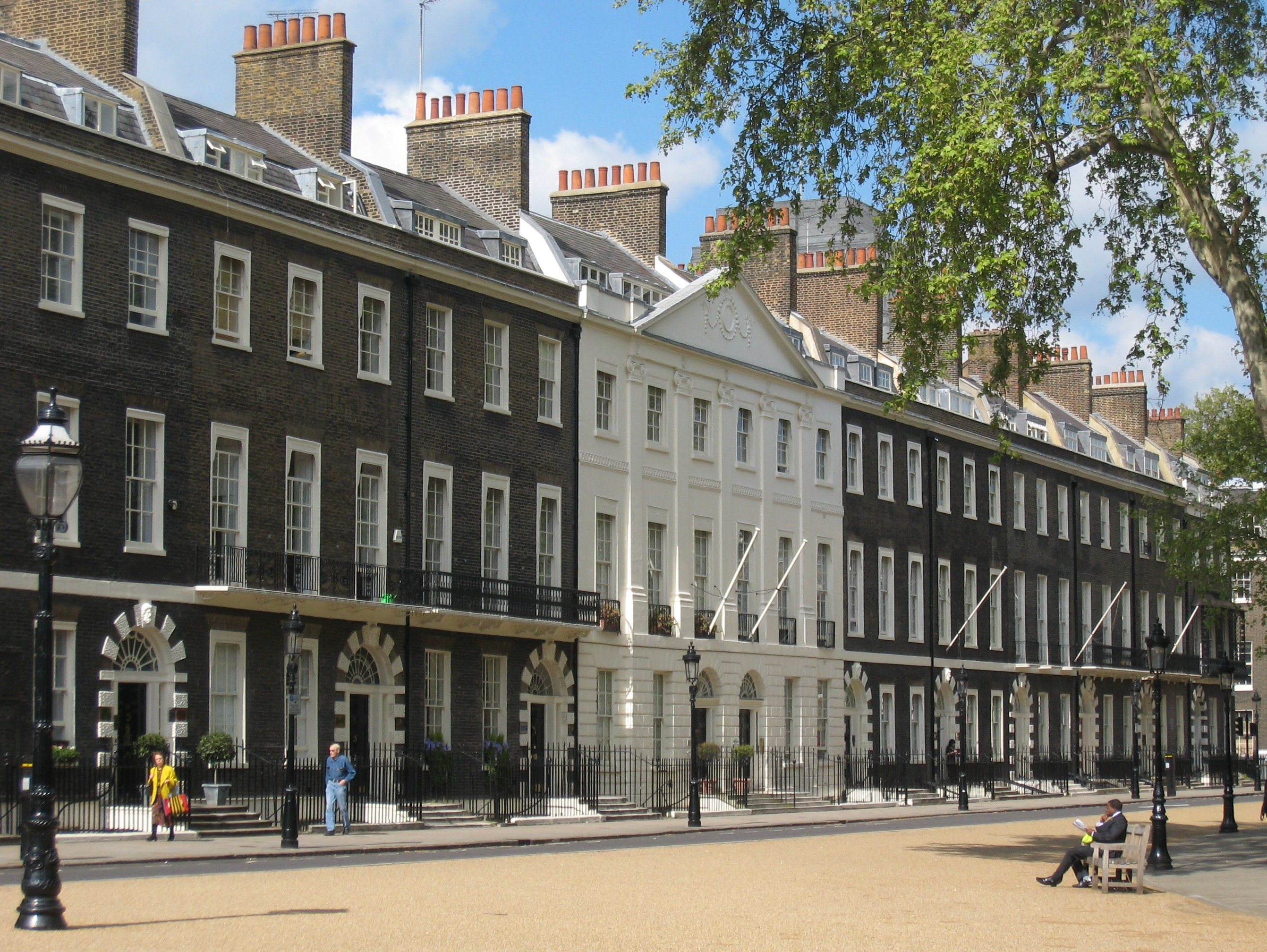
AA Bedford Square premises

She was appointed - from a three-strong shortlist - as the first female permanent director of the Architectural Association in London in 2018, succeeding Brett Steele.

Under her tenure the AA gained taught degree awarding powers for the first time in the institution’s history and financial stability, enabling the relaunch of AA Files and the publications department after the institution had closed them due to a financial crisis prior to Franch’s appointment. In autumn 2019, Franch launched the AA Residence, a research and cultural platform to develop new ideas and forms of practice at the intersection of architecture, art, technology, policy and design including the AA Wood Lab and the AA Ground Lab. Franch launched the Experimental Program, the Speculative Studies department as well as a set of changes to ignite cross-programme collaborations around issues of climate and diversity. Franch introduced a series of pedagogical experiments including the Open Tutorials, the Open Seminars and the Architecture in Translation Juries. During her tenure, Franch launched the AA Global Forums, a student care centre, the writing centre, a careers office and a hardship fund to support students and alumni worldwide. She also launched the Expanding Horizons campaign, offering, for the first time, full scholarships across all programmes to deserving students across the globe.

Following votes of no confidence in her leadership, Franch was fired in July 2020 for "failure to develop and implement a strategy and maintain the confidence of the AA School Community which were specific failures of performance against clear objectives outlined in the original contract of employment." Her dismissal came despite support from academics who wrote an open letter talking of "systemic biases" against women and of sexism, and accusing the AA of using "the pandemic for anti-democratic purposes". A number of academics later retracted their names from the letter after learning further details of her dismissal. Architectural magazine Dezeen reported tutor and alumni views that the failure to investigate allegations of bullying and sexism had damaged both the AA school and the architecture profession, leaving "a cloud over the school". However, a retaliatory open letter from two male AA tutors called the accusation of sexism "grossly uninformed", while other letters accused the AA of mixing the vote on leadership with "systemic issues" relating to its lack of diversity. Franch herself remained silent, her PR consultant saying she could not comment for legal reasons.

=== 2020-present ===
In January 2021, Franch became a visiting lecturer at Princeton University School of Architecture. In May 2022, Franch was one of the three artistic directors of the Barcelona Architectures Festival.

== Activities ==
Franch's work has been exhibited internationally including at FAD Barcelona, the Venice Biennale of Architecture, the Vitra Design Museum, and the Shenzhen Biennale of Architecture and Urbanism among others.

As an educator, Franch has directed the Thesis Studios at The Cooper Union and Rice University School of Architecture and taught seminars and design studios at Princeton University, Columbia University GSAPP, the IUAV University of Venice, SUNY Buffalo, and Rice University School of Architecture.

Franch has lectured internationally on art, architecture, pedagogy, curatorial practices, and the importance of alternative visions and initiatives in the construction and understanding of public life at educational and cultural institutions including the Arts Club of Chicago, University of Hong Kong, Institute of Modern Art in Brisbane, IAAC in Barcelona, Izolyatsia in Kyiv, Kuwait University, the Museum of Fine Arts in Sydney, Oslo School of Architecture and Design, Princeton University, San Francisco Art Institute, Sandberg Institute in Amsterdam, School of Visual Arts in New York, SCI-Arc in Los Angeles, Tokyo University, University of Manitoba, UT Sydney, the World Around, the World Cultural Forum, the World Urban Forum, and Yale University, among others.

Franch currently serves as a non-executive board member in cultural and educational organizations around the world and has been part of international competition juries and member of several nominating and advisory boards including the Future Architecture Platform, the Royal Institute of British Architects, the Hong Kong Design Trust, the New Museum Ideas City, and the Times Square Arts Program.

== Publications ==
In 2012, following the Manifesto Series events at Storefront for Art and Architecture in New York, Franch launched a new publication series with design by Natasha Jen/Pentagram and Lars Muller with the first issue Formless edited by Julian Rose and Garret Ricciardi and Double edited by Serkan Özkaya. Contributors included art and architecture historians Hal Foster, Lucia Allais, Spyridon Papapetros, Alanna Heiss, Yve-Alain Bois, and Ines Weizman, among others.

In 2019, while at the helm of the Architectural Association, Franch relaunched AA Files and appointed Maria Sheherazade Giudici as new editor and head of AA Publications and Sacha Lobe/Pentagram as the new head of design. The opening issue, Files 76, presented a glossary of terms relevant to contemporary debate in architecture addressing issues such as environment, care, labour, protocols, and ethics.

Publications by Franch include Agenda (Lars Muller, 2014), Atlas (Lars Muller, 2015) and Manual (Lars Muller 2017) as part of OfficeUS.

Franch’s work has appeared in the form of articles and interviews in magazines, newspapers and publications including AD, Architecture Record, Architectural Review, ArchDaily, Arquine, Bauwelt, Bazar, Deezen, Domus, Dwell, El Pais, La Vanguardia, Metropolis, MOUSSE, Pin-UP, Rolling Stone, Surface Magazine, The Evening Standard, The Financial Times, The Guardian, The New York Times, and The Observer, among others.

== Awards ==
Franch, who graduated with honors from ETSAB and Princeton, is a first generation student and an advocate for free education. She has received numerous scholarships and awards, including the Reyner Banham Fellowship (2008), the Wortham Fellowship (2009-10), the La Caixa Fellowship (2005-07), a Schloss Solitude Fellowship (2010) and grants from the National Endowment for the Arts, the Graham Foundation and the US State Department.

Franch was named by the New York Times / T Magazine Spain, architect of the year in 2019, one of the most influential people in London by the Evening Standard in 2018 as well as one of the "New Change Makers" of 2020 by Harper's Bazaar magazine. She received a special citation by the American Institute of Architects in New York for her contribution to the field in 2018 and the Polytechnic University of Catalonia Illustrious Alumni Award in 2019.
