= Ana Miljacki =

American professor of architecture

Ana Miljački is a historian, theorist, educator and curator of architecture. She is an associate professor of architecture at MIT where she directs the Critical Broadcasting Lab, the Architecture and Urbanism Group and the Master of Architecture Program.

== Education ==
Miljački received a B.A. Thematic Major in Architecture from Bennington College in 1995. She then went on to Rice University where she graduated with her Masters in Architecture in 1999, and continued on to defend her PhD in History and Theory of Architecture at Harvard University GSD in 2007 titled "The Optimum Aesthetic: Environment, Lifestyle and Utopia in Postwar Czech Architectural Discourse." Her dissertation went on to be published as a book in 2017.

== Career ==
In 2001 Miljački was a visiting instructor at the Dessau Institute of Architecture. In 2004 Miljački became an Adjunct Assistant Professor of Architecture at Columbia University GSAPP where she would continue to teach until 2007. In 2005 Miljački also become an Instructor in Architecture and subsequently a Principal Instructor in Architecture at Harvard Graduate School of Design. During her time at the Harvard GSD Ana Miljački also worked as an Adjunct Assistant Professor of Architecture at the SSA, (now Bernard and Anne Spritzer School of Architecture) City College of New York. In 2006 Ana was appointed an Adjunct Assistant Professor of Architecture at Barnard College.

In 2008 Miljački became an Assistant Professor of Architecture at the Massachusetts Institute of Technology, where she still teaches today. In 2017, she was tenured and promoted to associate professor. Miljacki has been Directing the Master of Architecture Program at MIT since 2016. In 2018 she launched her Critical Broadcasting Lab at MIT.

Miljački has worked at numerous architectural firms. In 1998 she was employed as a graphic designer Interloop Architecture in Houston, Texas, did work as a consultant for Interior Architects, Inc. in New York, NY and worked as a designer for Lindy Roy Architect in New York, NY. Following this Miljački went on to work for Willis, Bricker, and Cannady Architects as an Architecture Intern in 1999. In 2001 Miljački began work as a researcher and video designer at AMO/OMA in New York before founding Project in 2002, an architecture thought practice based in Brooklyn, NY and Boston, MA where she is still a principal today.

Miljački was part of the three member curatorial team, with Eva Franch i Gilabert and Ashley Schafer, of the US Pavilion at the 2014 Venice Architecture Biennale, where their Biennale project, titled OfficeUS, critically examined the last century of US architectural offices; their professionalization and their concomitant global contribution.

== Awards ==
In 2013 Ana Miljački was named one of the winners of Design Biennale Boston. In 2008 she was one of the winners of The Architectural League Prize: Resonance. Other notable awards include her 2012 ACSA Award for the Best in Design as Research in JAE, and her 2012 Audi Urban Futures Award as curator for Höweler+Yoon Architects.

== Publications ==
- “An Old Glossary for the New Metallurgists,” Post-Ductility: Metals in Architecture and Engineering, ed. Michael Bell and Craig Buckley (Princeton Architectural Press, June 2012).
- “The Logic of the Critical and the Dangers of ‘Recuperation’, or, Whatever Happened to the Critical Promise of Tschumi's Advertisements for Architecture?” Critical Tools (La Lettre Volee, March 2012).
- “Project_,” Young Architects 10: Resonance(Princeton Architectural Press, 2009).
- “The Practice of Utopia, The Story of SIAL in an Image and a Letter,” SIAL Architects, ed. Miroslav Masak (Prague, November 2008).
- “Classes, Masses, Crowds. Representing the Collective Body and the Myth of Direct Knowledge,” Making Things Public exhibition Catalogue, eds. Bruno Latour and Peter Wiebel, (MIT Press, 2005).
