= Dennis Rasmussen (baseball) =

American baseball player (born 1959)

Billings Mustangs
- Pitcher / Coach
- Born: April 18, 1959 (age 67); Los Angeles, California, U.S.
- Batted: Left Threw: Left

MLB debut
- September 16, 1983, for the San Diego Padres

Last MLB appearance
- July 1, 1995, for the Kansas City Royals

MLB statistics
- Win–loss record: 91–77
- Earned run average: 4.15
- Strikeouts: 835
- Stats at Baseball Reference

Teams
- San Diego Padres (1983); New York Yankees (1984–1987); Cincinnati Reds (1987–1988); San Diego Padres (1988–1991); Chicago Cubs (1992); Kansas City Royals (1992–1993, 1995)

Dennis Lee Rasmussen (born April 18, 1959) is an American former professional baseball pitcher. He played in Major League Baseball for the San Diego Padres (1983 and 1988–91), New York Yankees (1984–87), Cincinnati Reds (1987–88), Chicago Cubs (1992), and Kansas City Royals (1992–93 and 1995). He batted and threw left-handed.

== Amateur career ==
Rasmussen was born in Los Angeles on April 18, 1959, and grew up in San Clemente, California. He nearly lost his left foot at the age of 14, when a speeding car knocked him from his bicycle on Labor Day in 1973, and the fall severed his foot, which was hanging by the Achilles tendon. An emergency room doctor said they would need to amputate, but an orthopedic surgeon was able to save the foot. As a result, he has no cartilage in his left ankle.

Rasmussen attended San Clemente High School. Six months after the injury, he recovered sufficiently to play in the final two games of the season for the junior varsity basketball team. After one year at San Clemente High School, his family moved to Boise, Idaho, and he attended Meridian High School in Meridian, Idaho, for two years. His family moved to Denver, Colorado, and he went to Bear Creek High School in Lakewood, Colorado, for his senior year. He was named All-State in baseball and basketball, and was a member of the Number 1 Tennis Doubles team with fellow Basketball teammate, Ed Bartlett that won a State Championship.

The Pittsburgh Pirates selected Rasmussen in the 18th round of the 1977 Major League Baseball draft, but he did not sign with the Pirates. As he wanted to play college basketball, he enrolled at Creighton University, which offered him a scholarship to play for the Creighton Bluejays men's basketball team. The arrangement with Creighton also allowed him to play college baseball for the Creighton Bluejays baseball team. For the basketball team, he was a forward who played as the sixth man off the bench. For the baseball team, he had a 3–6 win–loss record and a 3.38 earned run average (ERA) with Creighton in his junior year, with 84 strikeouts, a school record, in 61 2/3 innings pitched. He was named to the All-Missouri Valley Conference's First Team.

== Professional career ==
The California Angels selected Rasmussen in the first round, with the 17th overall selection, of the 1980 Major League Baseball draft. He signed with the Angels and made his professional debut with the Salinas Angels of the Class A California League. In 1981, he pitched for the Holyoke Millers of the Class AA Eastern League. He set a team record with 16 strikeouts on August 18. In 1981, Rasmussen pitched for the Spokane Indians of the Class AAA Pacific Coast League (PCL). He had a 11–8 record and 5.03 ERA with Spokane, and was second in the PCL with 162 strikeouts. After the 1982 season, the Angels sent Rasmussen to the New York Yankees as the player to be named later in the August 31 trade that sent Tommy John to the Angels. Rasmussen played for the Columbus Clippers of the Class AAA International League in 1983, leading the league with 13 wins and 187 strikeouts. The Yankees traded him to the San Diego Padres on September 12, 1983, with Edwin Rodríguez, to complete an earlier trade for John Montefusco. He made his major league debut with the Padres on September 16, and made his first start on October 1.

On March 30, 1984, the Padres traded Rasmussen and a player to be named later to the Yankees for Graig Nettles. He began the 1984 season with Columbus, and was promoted to the major leagues in May, earning his first major league win on May 23, his first major league start of the 1984 season. Rasmussen competed for the fifth spot in the Yankees' rotation in 1986. Though originally slated to start the season in Columbus, he was named to the Opening Day starting rotation after John was plagued by back spasms. In 1986, Rasmussen won 18 games. His batting average against of .217 was the second best in the American League. In 1987, he was named Opening Day starter at Detroit against Jack Morris; the Yankees won in 10 innings. Rasmussen had a 9–7 record and a 4.75 ERA with the Yankees before they traded him to the Cincinnati Reds for Bill Gullickson on August 27.

Rasmussen began the 1988 season pitching to a 2–6 record with a 5.75 ERA for Cincinnati. On June 8, the Reds traded Rasmussen to the Padres for Candy Sierra. He went 14–4 with a 2.55 ERA in 20 starts for the Padres, finishing the year with an overall 16–10 record and a 3.43 ERA. After the season, Rasmussen re-signed with the Padres on a two-year contract reportedly worth $1.3 million. In 1990, Rasmussen had a 11–15 record, but led the National League in home runs allowed with 28. He re-signed with the Padres for the 1991 season, receiving a $805,000 salary. He had a 6–13 record and a 3.74 ERA with San Diego in 1991.

Rasmussen signed a minor league contract with the Baltimore Orioles organization for the 1992 season, and was assigned to the Rochester Red Wings of the International League. He was 0–7 with a 5.67 ERA in nine starts for Rochester, and they released him on June 2. A few days later, the Chicago Cubs signed Rasmussen and assigned him to the Iowa Cubs of the Class AAA American Association. The Cubs promoted him to the major leagues a week later, following an injury to Dave Smith, On July 13, the Cubs put Rasmussen on the disabled list due to tendinitis in his left shoulder, and they released him on July 21, having pitched five innings for the Cubs. The Kansas City Royals then signed Rasmussen and assigned him to the Omaha Royals of the American Association. They promoted him to the major leagues on September 10. On September 29, Rasmussen pitched a complete game one-hitter against the Angels.

In February 1994, Rasmussen signed a minor league contract worth $125,000 with the San Francisco Giants for the 1994 season. The Giants assigned him to the Phoenix Firebirds of the PCL. He was released on May 2 to make room for Tony Menéndez on the roster. He had a 4.20 ERA and led the team with 30 innings pitched at the time. He signed with the Royals on May 27, and was assigned to Omaha. He re-signed with the Royals for the 1995 season, and started the year with Omaha, pitching to a 6–3 record with a 2.89 ERA with Omaha before Kansas City promoted him to the major leagues on June 4. Rasmussen pitched in five games, to a 0–1 record and a 9.00 ERA, before the Royals designated him for assignment. He refused an assignment to Omaha, and was released on July 7. In 1996, he received no offers from major league teams, so he signed with the Rimini Baseball Club of the Italian Baseball League. He had a 2–1 record and a 2.30 ERA, but pulled a hamstring and returned to the United States to rehabilitate.

== Coaching career ==
While he was rehabilitating his pulled hamstring, the Tampa Bay Devil Rays hired Rasmussen to be their pitching coach for the Butte Copper Kings for the 1996 season. They assigned him to coach for the Charleston RiverDogs in 1997. In 1998, he was hired by the Boston Red Sox to be the pitching coach for the Lowell Spinners. Rasmussen stepped away from coaching professional baseball to spend more time with his family. In 2021, he resumed his coaching career with Bluefield Ridge Runners in the Appalachian League and later coached the Frederick Keys and Billings Mustangs. He continues to coach in Little League Baseball.

== Personal life ==
Rasmussen's grandfather Bill Brubaker played in the major leagues with the Pittsburgh Pirates (1932–1940) and the Boston Braves (1943). Rasmussen resides in Trenton, Michigan, with his wife Renee (née Hayden) and son, Hayden. He is the father of four daughters, Ashley, Stephanie, Brynn and Michelle. He owns and operates Charlevoix Dairy Grille with his wife Renee in Charlevoix, Michigan.
