= Peggy Deamer =

American architect

Peggy Deamer (née: Margaret Deamer; born February 15, 1950) is an architect, architectural educator, and Emeritus Professor of Architecture at Yale University. Her research explores the nature of creative work, stretching from a psychoanalytic interpretation of art production and reception – initiated in the dissertation on Adrian Stokes, who was analyzed by Melanie Klein – to neo-Marxist examinations of creative labor. She is the founding member of the international advocacy group, The Architecture Lobby (TAL).

== Biography ==
Deamer received BA from Oberlin College, a B.Arch. from Cooper Union and a Ph.D. from Princeton University. Her dissertation was on the British art critic, Adrian Stokes. She has taught at Princeton University, Barnard College, Columbia University, Ohio State University, University of Kentucky. In New Zealand, where she was the Head of the School of Architecture and Planning at the University of Auckland in 2007, she taught at Unitec and Victoria University, but resigned from Auckland after five months. She has been a board member of Storefront for Art and Architecture and the Beverly Willis Architecture Foundation and is currently on the board of Perspecta: The Yale Journal of Architecture and a member of ArchiteXX.

== Projects ==
Montauk House, Montauk, NY, 1999 (Deamer+Phillips)

Waccabuc House Addition, Waccabuc, NY, 2003 (Deamer+Phillips)

Kaiwaka House, New Zealand, 2016 (Deamer Studio)

== Awards ==
John Q. Hejduk Award, Cooper Union, 2021

Artist Residency, "Labor," Santa Fe Art Institute, 2020

== Publications ==
=== Books ===
- Author, Architecture and Labor. 2020. Routledge. ISBN 978-0-367-34350-7
- Editor, The Architect as Worker: Immaterial Labor, the Creative Class, and the Politics of Design. 2015. Bloomsbury Academic. ISBN 978-1-4725-7049-9
- Editor, Architecture and Capitalism: 1845 to the Present. 2014. Routledge. ISBN 978-0-415-53488-8
- Editor with Phillip Bernstein, BIM in Academia. 2011. Yale School of Architecture. ISBN 978-0-9826385-8-3
- Editor with Phillip Bernstein, Building in the Future: Recasting Architectural Labor. 2010. Princeton Architecture Press. ISBN 978-1-56898-806-1

=== Articles ===
Recent articles include “Office Management,” in OfficeUS’s Agenda, “Work” in Perspecta 47, “The Changing Nature of Architectural Work,” in Design Practices Now Vol II, The Harvard Design Magazine no. 33; “Detail Deliberation,” in Building (in) the Future: Recasting Labor in Architecture; and “Practicing Practice,” in Perspecta 44. Her writing on architecture, design and psychoanalysis include “Adrian Stokes: Surface Suicide” in Architecture Post Mortem: The Diastolic Architecture of Decline, Dystopia, and Death (Ashgate, Donald Kunze, Editor), “Adrian Stokes: The Architecture of Phantasy and the Phantasy of Architecture, Architecture and Psychoanalysis: The Annuals of Psychoanalysis, and “Subject/Object/Text” in Drawing/Building/Text, (Princeton Architectural Press, Andrea Kahn, ed.)
