= Marc Schiechl =

American gridiron football player (born 1987)

No. 94
- Position: Linebacker

Personal information
- Born: November 30, 1987 (age 38); Lakewood, Colorado, U.S.
- Listed height: 6 ft 3 in (1.91 m)
- Listed weight: 270 lb (122 kg)

Career information
- High school: Bear Creek (Lakewood, Colorado)
- College: Colorado Mines
- NFL draft: 2011: undrafted

Career history
- Jacksonville Jaguars (2011); Hamilton Tiger-Cats (2012)*; Spokane Shock (2012–2013); Los Angeles Kiss (2014)*; San Jose SaberCats (2014)
- * Offseason or practice squad member only

Career AFL statistics
- Tackles: 24
- Sacks: 5
- Forced Fumbles: 1
- Fumble Recoveries: 1
- Interceptions: 1
- Stats at ArenaFan.com
- Stats at Pro Football Reference

Marc Schiechl (born November 30, 1987) is an American former professional football linebacker. He was signed by the Jacksonville Jaguars as an undrafted free agent in 2011. He played college football at The Colorado School of Mines.
