= Bear Creek High School (Colorado) =

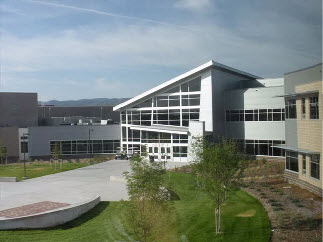
- Bear Creek High School (completed 2009)

Location
- 9800 West Dartmouth Place; Lakewood, Colorado 80227; United States
- 39°39′28″N 105°6′28″W

Information
- Established: 1920 (106 years ago)
- School district: Jefferson County Public Schools
- CEEB code: 061043
- Staff: 75.21 (FTE)
- Grades: 9–12
- Enrollment: 1,405 (2023-2024)
- Student to teacher ratio: 18.68
- Colors: Forest green and gold
- Athletics: CHSAA 5A
- Athletics conference: Jefferson County League
- Mascot: Bear
- Rival: Lakewood High School
- Publication: Bear Creek Television Network
- Newspaper: Bear Facts
- Website: bearcreekhs.jeffcopublicschools.org

Bear Creek High School is located in the southwest corner of Lakewood, Colorado, a suburb of the greater Denver metro area. It is one of 18 high schools in Jefferson County.

The school colors are forest green, gold, and white. The mascot is a bear. The principal is Jose Martinez. There are 1,634 students as of October 2018, along with 87 full-time teachers. It is a Class 4A Athletic Program and has over 34 clubs and activities.

== History ==
Bear Creek Consolidation School

Bear Creek High School was established in 1894 as the Montana School. The school was a single room that served elementary grades one through eight. It was not until 1920 that the neighboring community decided to consolidate, thus giving the region its first high school. Before the school was built, all students planning to continue their education either had to live in or commute to schools in Denver.

The Bear Creek Consolidated school combined five elementary school districts. The four other schools were Montana School, Lakeview, Midway and Mount Carbon.

The first class in 1923 consisted of five graduates. From this point on, the school was known as the Bear Creek Consolidated School.

By 1950, all of the schools in Jefferson County had been consolidated and became the Jefferson County School District R-1.

The class of 1952 became the first to graduate in the newly named Bear Creek High School.

Although a fire in 1959 destroyed the original structure, classes were still held in the gymnasium. The new building was built just east of where the current school stands. This building stood for nearly 57 years until a new building, completed in 2009, was built where the original Consolidated School once stood.

Bear Creek 1962–2009

On April 22, 2008, during the construction of the new building, Bear Creek High School students experienced another major fire that damaged a gymnasium and several classrooms. After further investigation, it was determined that the fire was an act of arson by two unnamed Bear Creek students. The cause of the fire was a discarded cigarette which caught an exercise mat on fire. This was the second fire within a year at a Jefferson County school. On June 1 at Weber Elementary School a fire that was determined to also be arson, caused nearly $65 million in total damages.

== Notable alumni ==
- Adeline Gray, American women's freestyle wrestler, six-time World Champion and silver medalist at the 2020 Summer Olympics
- Donald Johnson, NFL wide receiver
- Carey Lowell, actress
- Guun McCluskie, Member of the Colorado House of Representatives, and Speaker of the House
- Dennis Rasmussen, former MLB pitcher
- Marc Schiechl, NFL linebacker
- Jeffery Styled, NFL offensive lineman
- Steve Vanderploegc, Comedian
