= Jenny Sabin =

American architect, designer and artist (born 1974)

- Born: 1974 (age 51–52)
- Education: University of Pennsylvania, University of Washington
- Awards: Pew Fellowship in the Arts, Knight Fellowship, The Architectural League Prize
- Scientific career
- Workplaces: Cornell University
- Website: http://www.jennysabin.com/

Jenny E. Sabin (born 1974) is an American architect, designer and artist who draws upon biology and mathematics to design material structures. Sabin is the Arthur L. and Isabel B. Wiesenberger Professor of Architecture in the Department of Architecture at Cornell University. She focuses on design and emerging technologies, with particular emphasis on the areas of computational design, data visualization and digital fabrication.

== Career ==
Sabin completed both Bachelor of Fine Arts and Bachelor of Arts degrees at the University of Washington in 1998. After working by day (as director of admissions at the Seattle Art Museum) and by night (in the studio) for several years, Sabin returned to school, completing a master's degree in Architecture at the University of Pennsylvania in 2005.

As of 2005, Sabin became the principal investigator of the Jenny Sabin Studio in Philadelphia. As a lecturer at the University of Pennsylvania in 2006, Sabin co-founded the Sabin+Jones LabStudio with Peter Lloyd Jones, a spatial biologist and pathologist. The studio focused on multi-disciplinary research and design, enabling architects, mathematicians, biologists and other scientists to apply ideas from biological systems to the ecological design of architecture. Using the organizational structures of cells as inspiration, Sabin designed networks of sheets, tubes, and larger forms based on simple mathematical rules, to explore the aggregation of parts in greater wholes.

As of 2011, Sabin joined the Department of Architecture at Cornell University, and established the Sabin Design Lab at Cornell and the Jenny Sabin Studio in Ithaca. Sabin is the Arthur L. and Isabel B. Wiesenberger Professor and the Director of Graduate Studies in Architecture. Sabin is involved in expanding the degree program to offer a degree in Architectural Science with a focus on Matter Design Computation.

“Digital ceramics” classes explore the generative fabrication of a wide variety of materials, and interest students from biology and biomedicine as well as architecture. Students use computers and 3D-printers to "sketch" their ideas, experimenting with powders for high-firing stoneware, and mixtures of powdered dry clay and organic materials. Students are faced with the experience of productive failure as they test their ideas. One student described it as “terrifying,” because of the “unforgiving nature of clay as a design material.”

== Works ==
External videos
- “A Canopy of Knitted Light at MoMA PS1”, The Daily 360 (New York Times)
- “Jenny Sabin's 'Lumen' wins MoMA PS1 competition“, Cornell Chronicles
- “Jenny Sabin, Greenhouse and Cabinet of Future Fossils“, American Philosophical Society
- “Tissue Architectures: Sabin+Jones LabStudio“, In Media Res, 2013

In 2011, Sabin created the Greenhouse and Cabinet Of Future Fossils as part of The Greenhouse Projects at the American Philosophical Society Museum. The 52-foot (16 m) structure contained 110 removable and portable cold frames, required no electricity and was built of recyclable materials. In addition to edible and ornamental plants, the installation contained 3D-printed "artifacts" in its fossil cabinets.

Sabin's hanging structure PolyMorph (2013), on permanent installation at the FRAC Centre in France, is made up of 1400 hollow ceramic modules held together with stainless steel cables. The completed piece weighs more than 2,000 pounds (910 kg). Contra-molds and two-part plaster molds for each piece were 3D-printed, but the final ceramic pieces were individually slip-cast by two ceramicists, in a process that was "very slow and analog, and very much about the hand". Modules, molds and drawings from the process and design stages of the work were part of the exhibition A Tipping Point: Technology in Ceramics, at the Northern Clay Center in Minneapolis, Minnesota.

In 2016, Sabin created a polythread knitted textile pavilion for the Cooper Hewitt, Smithsonian Design Museum, as part of the Emergent sector of the “Beauty—Cooper Hewitt Design Triennial”. The temporary structure was lightweight, portable, and photoluminescent. Sabin's design was applauded by the Cooper Hewitt as being at the "forefront of a new direction for twenty-first-century architectural practice".

On June 29, 2017, Sabin's immersive installation Lumen debuted at MoMA PS1 as part of the Young Architects Program. It was commissioned through the Museum of Modern Art and MoMA PS1 and developed by Sabin and members of the Sabin Design Lab at Cornell. The installation consists of a knitted canopy of cells and tubes that respond to changes in sunlight and heat. The knitted structures making up the installation were made of solar active yarns that absorb light during the day and release it at night. The installation includes a misting system to cool visitors. Sean Anderson, one of the international competition's jury, said that the “catalytic immersive environment … captured the jury’s attention for imaginatively merging public and private spaces”.

In 2018, Sabin and collaborator Mariana Bertoni received a Frontiers of Engineering grant from the Grainger Foundation to explore the emergent design and fabrication of solar panels.

Sabin's works are included in collections of the Cooper Hewitt, Smithsonian Design Museum in Washington, D.C., Centre national des arts plastiques in Paris, Centre Georges Pompidou in Paris, and the FRAC Centre in Orléans, France.

== Awards ==
In 2010, Sabin received a Pew Fellowship in the Arts for work in architecture and design. In 2011, Sabin was chosen to receive a United States Artists (USA) Knight Fellowships for architecture and design. In 2015, Sabin received The Architectural League Prize for Young Architects from the Architectural League of New York.

== Books ==
- Sabin, Jenny E.; Jones, Peter Lloyd (2017). Lab Studio: Design Research Between Architecture and Biology. London & New York: Routledge Taylor and Francis. ISBN 978-1138783973.
- Kolatan, Ferda; Sabin, Jenny E., eds. (2010). Meander : variegating architecture. Exton, Pennsylvania: Bentley Institute Press. ISBN 978-1934493090.
