= Mabel Burkholder =

Canadian writer and historian

- Born: Canada
- Citizenship: Canada
- Occupations: Historian, writer

Mabel Grace Burkholder (1881–1973) was a Canadian writer and historian.

== Biography ==
Burkholder was born in 1881 to a family of German settlers. She taught for a short time after obtaining a teaching certificate before turning to writing. She published poetry, short stories, poems and books about the history of Hamilton, Ontario from 1911 to 1968. Burkholder had a regular local history column in The Hamilton Spectator and was a member of the city's branch of Canadian Women's Press Club. In 1938, Burkholder was named Hamilton's first Citizen of the Year.

== Bibliography ==
=== Books ===
- The course of Impatience Carningham. Toronto Musson Book. 1911.
- Before the white man came : Indian legends and stories. Toronto : McClelland & Stewart. 1923.
- The Shield of Honor (1929)
- The Story of Hamilton (1938)
- Barton on the Mount (1956)

=== Short stories ===
- Campbell, Sandra; McMullen, Lorraine, eds. (1991). "The Heart of Kerry (1907)". New women short stories by Canadian women, 1900-1920 (2. print ed.). Ottawa [Ont.]: University of Ottawa Press. ISBN 9780776603230.
