= Claire Weisz =

Architect

Claire Weisz is an architect and co-founder of the firm WXY who have been involved in significant elements of redesigning New York City's built landscape.

Weisz was recognized by Architectural Record with the Women in Architecture Award and won American Institute of Architects's New York chapter's 2018 Medal of Honor. Weisz and her work was also featured in the 2022 book, The Women Who Changed Architecture.

Weisz grew up in Alberta and was a co-founder of the Design Trust for Public Space and as of 2019 was a City College professor. Prior academic roles included Wagner Graduate School of Public Service at NYU.
