= Lisa Sigal =

American painter and sculptor (born 1962)

Lisa Sigal (born 1962) is a contemporary artist who lives and works in Brooklyn, New York.

== Life and work ==
Sigal was born in Philadelphia, Pennsylvania.

She works with painting, sculpture and architecture. Her constructions insinuate themselves into the fabric of the built environment. She will take a Sheetrock wall, cut into it, pull back sections, poke a sightline through to a false or a found wall on which she has exposed or composed a painted surface.

Sigal's solo and group exhibitions include: Factory Installed, Mattress Factory, Pittsburgh (2015) Prospect.3: Notes for Now, New Orleans (2014–15); Riverbed, LAX Art, Los Angeles (2013); Building, Dwelling, Thinking, NOMA Gallery, San Francisco (2010); Museum as Hub: Six Degrees, New Museum, New York (2008); The 2008 Whitney Biennial, New York; Tent Paintings, Frederieke Taylor Gallery, New York (2007); The Orpheus Selection, PS1 Contemporary Art Center, Long Island City (2007); Make It Now, SculptureCenter, Long Island City, (2005); and A House of Many Mansions, Aldrich Contemporary Art Museum, Ridgefield, Connecticut (2005).

Sigal is the co-founder and co-curator, with Nova Benway, of Open Sessions, a program for artists run by The Drawing Center.
