= Storefront for Art and Architecture =

American non-profit organization

Coordinates: 40°43′17.3″N 73°59′49.5″W

- Formation: 1982
- Founder: Kyong Park
- Purpose: Advancement of architecture, art and design
- Headquarters: SoHo, Manhattan, New York, United States
- Website: storefront.nyc

Storefront for Art and Architecture is an independent, non-profit art and architecture organization located in Manhattan's SoHo neighborhood. The organization is committed to the advancement of innovative positions in architecture, art and design.

== Background ==
The organization was founded in 1982 by Kyong Park with R.L. Seltman and Arleen Schloss in a tiny storefront at 51 Prince Street, "to support the idea that art and design have the potential and responsibility to affect public policies which influence the quality of life and future of all cities.” With co-director Glenn Weiss (1984–86), Storefront implemented its "civic dialogue and activist" project format and moved Storefront to its location at Kenmare Street.

The artist Shirin Neshat co-directed Storefront with her husband Kyong Park until the mid-1990s, and Park was the executive director from its founding until 1998.

At its outset, Storefront balanced solo or group exhibitions with ideas, competitions and exhibitions to functionally and/or poetically address NYC issues with social implications. Early topics addressed include the polluted Gowanus Canal in 1983, New York City Homeless Shelters in 1985, preservation of Adam Purple's "Garden on Eden" in 1984, and removal of Richard Serra's "Tilted Arc" in 1985. Early exhibitors included Lebbeus Woods, Coop Himmelblau, Dan Graham, Carolee Schneemann, Michael Sorkin, Richard Serra, Imre Makovecz, Neil Denari, Zvi Hecker, SITE, Steven Holl, Thom Mayne, and Tehching Hsieh. The 1987 exhibition "Bodybuildings" was the first solo show of the New York-based architecture practice Diller + Scofidio.

In 1993 Storefront commissioned a collaboration between artist Vito Acconci and architect Steven Holl to redesign the facade of the Kenmare Street gallery space. The resulting project transformed the structure by placing rotating panels of various orientation along the length of the gallery's facade. When the panels are open the design is meant to blur the border between the gallery and the street in order to create a dialogue between the experimental projects being exhibited inside and the city outside. Though the original design was only intended to last for two years, the unique architecture has stuck around since its completion in 1993. In January 1994 the first exhibition to be presented in the gallery after the installation of Acconci and Holl's redesigned facade was held: „Upstairs Down. The Pit, The Tower, The Terrace Plateau“ by Peter Noever, curated by Kyong Park, Shirin Neshat and Peter Noever. The exhibition was the first to be presented in the gallery after the installation of Acconci and Holl's redesigned facade. The facade underwent restoration in the summer of 2008.

In 2006–2007, the exhibition “Clip/Stamp/Fold: The Radical Architecture of Little Magazines,” organized by architectural historian and curator Beatriz Colomina, addressed the important role of independent architecture publications in the architectural movements of the 1960s and 1970s. The Pop-Up exhibition "CCCP: Cosmic Communist Constructions Photographed" was held in an unused portion of a print shop on Sunset Boulevard in Los Angeles from April 11 to May 17, 2008, and featured Frédéric Chaubin's photographs of late Soviet architecture. In 2009, the Spacebuster, a portable, expandable pavilion designed by Raumlabor to transform public spaces of all kinds into points for community gathering, traveled throughout Manhattan and Brooklyn for 10 consecutive evenings hosting various community events. In 2011, Storefront responded to the Occupy Wall Street movement in New York City by calling for public submissions of ideas for improving communication with economic and political powers. In 2012, Storefront teamed up with design studios Family New York and PlayLab to help add exposure for the +POOL project, as part of the Storefront Starter initiative.

A series of talks, "Postopolis!," were held in New York (2007), Los Angeles (2009) and Mexico City (2010) reflect about the current state of cities and design practices.

In 2014, the Storefront led the project "Letters to The Mayor," which Domus journal described as "a program designed to highlight the sometimes overlooked relationship between architects and local political authorities, and to facilitate new conversations between them." Several exhibition have specifically worked with the Acconci/Holl facade as a key element of design, including SO-IL’s design for the “Blueprint” exhibition, and Abruzzo Bodziak Architects’ design for the exhibition “Architecture Books—Yet to be Written,” the anchor program for the 2018 New York Architecture Book Fair.

In 2017, Storefront founded the New York Architectural Book Fair, which consisted of a series of salons in private libraries, an exhibition at Storefront's gallery space, and a network of pop-up architecture book collections in partnership with local bookstores and cultural organizations.

== Description ==
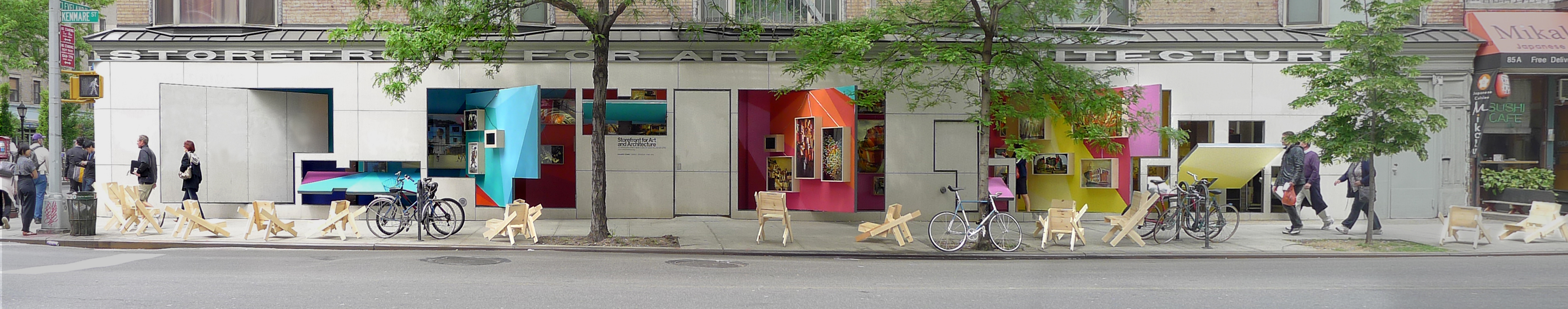
Exterior view of the gallery during an exhibit.

Storefront is located in a triangular ground-level space on 97 Kenmare Street in Soho, NY. Nearly 100 feet long, the gallery tapers from 20 feet to 3 feet at its west end.

Storefront's programming includes exhibitions, events (performances, artists talks, film screenings, conferences), competitions and publications.

=== Exhibitions ===
Exhibitions have ranged from single artist site-specific installations to thematic group shows that have addressed issues from new technology to the social and political forces that shape the built environment.

=== Discussions ===
Storefront also provides a forum for discussion of contemporary issues through book discussions, film screenings or performances with a goal to expose innovative ideas.

Examples of artists and architects that have participated in Storefront events include Bernard Tschumi, Hilary Sample, Peter Cook, Mark Wigley, Jenny Sabin, Oana Stanescu, Bryony Roberts, Tatiana Bilbao, Mabel Wilson, Meejin Yoon, Juergen Mayer, Jimenez Lai, Rosalyne Shieh, Jing Liu (architect), Mitchell Joachim, and Saskia Sassen.

=== Competitions ===
Storefront has also held a series of competitions with the aim to address relevant issues within contemporary culture. In 1985 within the exhibition "Homeless at Home" a call for designs asked for the projection of alternative housing models for homeless in New York. In 1985, "Before the Whitney" asked for alternative designs for the Whitney Museum. In 2008 "White House Redux" asked for alternative designs of the White House. In 2010, Total Housing asked for new typologies of inhabitation that addressed outmoded ideas of domestic space and contemporary urban lifestyles. In 2011, on the occasion of the Festival of Ideas for the New City, "StreetFest" asked for alternative models of temporary outdoor spaces for public occupation and gathering.

== Directors ==
- 1982-1998: Shirin Neshat and husband Kyong Park
- Sarah Herda
- Joseph Grima
- 2010–2018: Eva Franch i Gilabert
- 2018–: José Esparza Chong Cuy

== See also ==
- Museum of Modern Art (MoMA)
- MoMA PS1
- Museum of Modern Art (MARCO)
