= Thomas L. Schumacher =

American architect

Thomas L Schumacher (1941–2009) was an American academic architect and a Fellow of the American Academy in Rome. He was well known throughout the architecture community for his role in the development of Contextualism, along with Colin Rowe, under whom he studied at Cornell; and for his expertise in rationalist Italian architecture. Schumacher is ranked in the 90th percentile for research in architecture in a survey of over 3,000 architecture professors. He was also a registered architect and a member of the Society of Architectural Historians.

== Life, education and career ==
Thomas L. Schumacher was born on November 7, 1941, in New York City, and grew up in the Bronx, where he attended the now defunct Wm. Howard Taft High School, graduating in 1958. Schumacher Attended Cornell University where he earned a Bachelor of Architecture in 1963 and a Master of Architecture in 1966. His M.Arch thesis, "South Amboy new town; an exercise in urban form", was directed by Colin Rowe and was influential in the development of the contextualism school of thought. Schumacher was awarded the Rome Prize for architecture in 1967, studying at the American Academy in Rome until 1969. In 1977, he became a registered architect in the state of New Jersey.

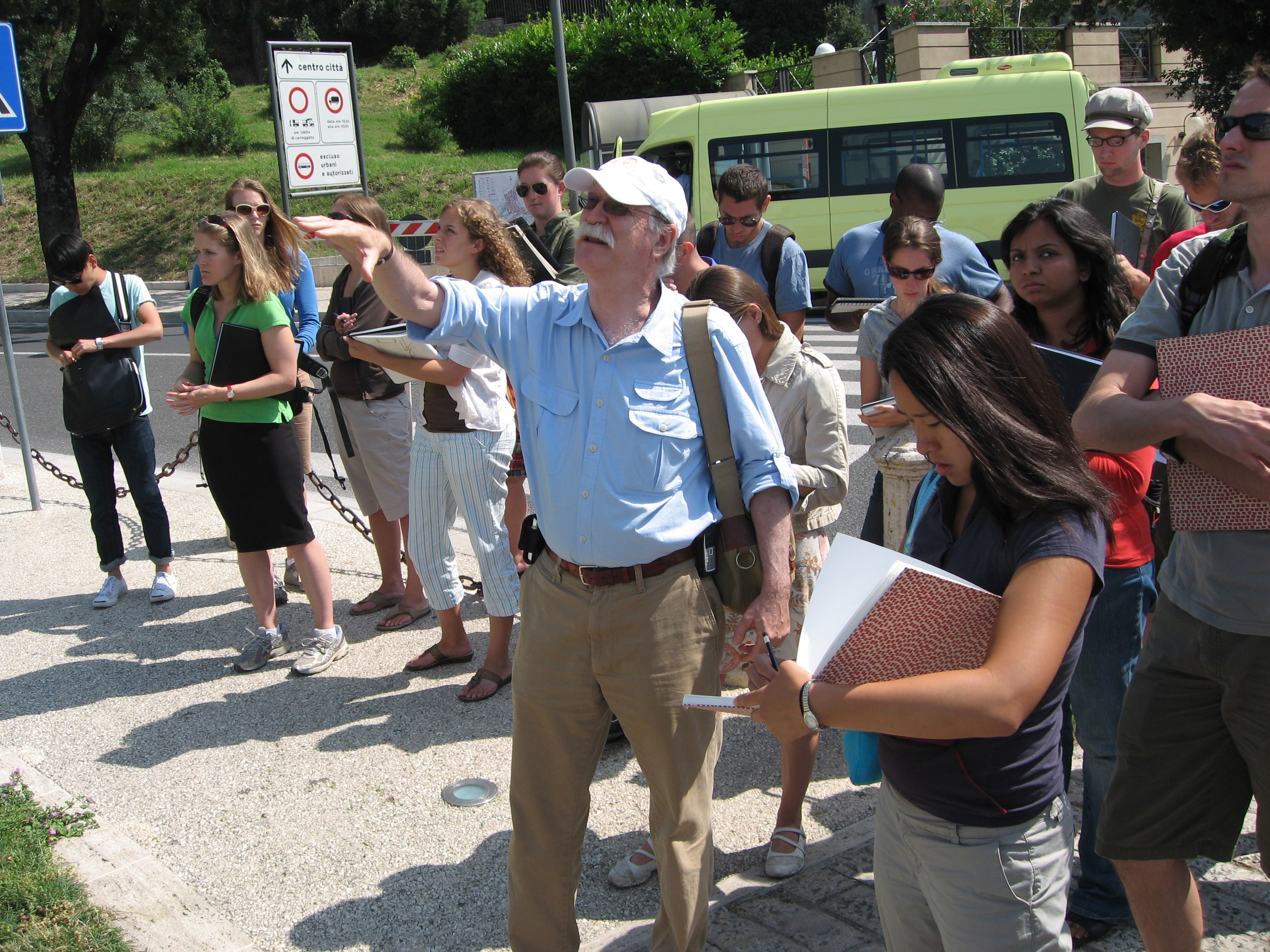
Tom Schumacher in Todi, Italy in 2008

Schumacher has taught at Catholic University of America (1977-1983), Princeton University (1972-1978), University of Virginia (1978-1984), University Iuav of Venice (Italy), Syracuse University in Florence (1991, 1993-4, 1996, 2000), and University of Maryland, College Park (1984-2009). He has given over 100 lectures at universities throughout North America and Europe.

Following his death in July 2009, the University of Maryland School of Architecture established a scholarship in his honor for students wishing to study abroad in Rome.

=== Honors and awards ===
Distinguished Professor, ACSA (1993)

RAAR, American Academy in Rome (1991)

FAAR, American Academy in Rome (1967)

Robert James Eidlitz Fellowship, Cornell University (1963)

== Selected works ==
Sole author:

- The Danteum, New York: Princeton Architectural Press, 1996. English.
- Surface and Symbol: Giuseppe Terragni and the Architecture of Italian Rationalism, New York: Princeton Architectural Press, 1991. English.
- L'immagine della ragione: La Casa del Fascio di Giuseppe Terragni, 1932-1936, Italy: Punto di vista, 1989. Italian.
- Giuseppe Terragni (Global Architecture Document), Japan: AIA Editors, 1994. Language.
- Giuseppe Terragni, 1904-1943, Italy: Publisher, 1992. Italian.

Co-author:

- Schumacher, Thomas and Galen Cranz. The Built Environment for the Elderly: A planning and design study, USA: Publisher, 1975. English.

Articles/as contributing author:

- Contextualism: Urban Ideals and Deformations, in Theorizing a New Agenda for Architecture: An Anthology of Architectural Theory, 1965-1995 by Kate Nesbitt. New York: Princeton Architectural Press, 1996. English.
- Introduction, The architecture of Frank Schlesinger. Washington DC, Grayson Publishing: 2005. English.
- "Horizontality: The Modernist Line". Journal of Architectural Education, 2005. 59:1.
- "The Outside is the Result of the Inside: on the origins of some modern prescriptions concerning facades". Journal of Architectural Education, 2002. 56:1
- "The Skull and the Mask: The Modern Movement and the Dilemma of the Facade". Cornell Journal of Architecture, Issue 3: The Vertical Surface. New York: Rizzoli International, 1988.
- "The Palladio Variations: On Reconciling Convention, Parti, and Space". Cornell Journal of Architecture, Issue 3: The Vertical Surface. New York: Rizzoli International, 1988.

Dissertations:

- South Amboy new town; an exercise in urban form. Thesis/Dissertation, M.Arch: 1966. Held at Cornell University Library.
- Fiorello LaGuardia High School; the New York High School of Visual Art. Thesis/Dissertation, B.Arch: 1963. Held at Cornell University Library.
