= The Journal of Architecture =

- Discipline: Architecture
- Language: English
- Edited by: Stephen Parnell

Publication details
- Publisher: Routledge for the Royal Institute of British Architects
- Frequency: 8/year

Standard abbreviations
- ISO 4: J. Archit.

Indexing
- ISSN: 1360-2365 (print); 1466-4410 (web)

Links
- Journal homepage

The Journal of Architecture is a peer-reviewed academic journal published eight times a year by Routledge on behalf of the Royal Institute of British Architects. It was established in 1996.
