= Steve Burkholder =

American politician

Mayor of Lakewood, Colorado
- In office 1999–2007
- Succeeded by: Bob Murphy

Personal details
- Party: Republican
- Education: University of Colorado Boulder; Harvard Kennedy School
- Occupation: Politician, Consultant

Steve Burkholder was the Republican mayor of Lakewood, Colorado, from 1999 to 2007. He was re-elected to a second term as mayor in November 2003 after serving a previous term on City Council. In 2007 he was term limited. He is the owner of the A&S Group, a marketing and consulting organization. He was succeeded as mayor by Bob Murphy.

Burkholder has an undergraduate degree from the University of Colorado at Boulder. He is also a graduate of the Senior Executives in State and Local Government Program at the John F. Kennedy School of Government, Harvard University.

== See also ==
- List of mayors of Lakewood, Colorado
