= Sean Canty =

American architect

Sean Canty is an American architect, cultural activist and academic. He is currently an Associate Professor of Architecture at the Harvard University Graduate School of Design, in Cambridge. Canty is co-director of Office III, an experimental architectural collective, and founder of Studio Sean Canty based in Boston.

== Early life and education ==
Sean Canty received a Master of Architecture degree from Harvard University's Graduate School of Design and a Bachelor of Architecture degree from the California College of the Arts. During his academic tenure, he taught at the Cooper Union in New York City, University of California Berkeley, and California College of the Arts. Before establishing his own firm, he was a Project Designer at Iwamoto Scott Architecture in San Francisco.

== Career ==
In 2020, Canty created a widely published list of 200 black creatives practicing in the United States as a response to Black Lives Matter. The list was a compilation of designers, artists and architects including Thelma Golden, Germane Barnes, Olalekan Joyifous, V.Mitch McEwen and many others. In 2017, as part of Office III, Canty designed and constructed an all timber visitors' center for Governors Island in New York City.

Canty's current design focus is on residential work which he has presented during several academic lectures across the United States including public talks at the University of Pennsylvania, AIA New York Center for Architecture, Ohio State University, Le Laboratory, CU Denver, California College of the Arts, Cal Poly Pomona and Cornell University to name a few. His work has been exhibited in several institutions and museums including the Storefront for Art and Architecture in New York. In June 2021, his work titled “Drawing Doubles” was exhibited at the SoHo's a83 gallery as part of the “Architectural Drawing: Not for Construction” exhibition.

== Public talks ==
Sean Canty has been a frequent speaker and lecturer at several academic institutions across the U.S. and globally including University of Pennsylvania, California College of the Arts, Ohio State, Center for Architecture, Wentworth Institute of Technology, CU Denver, CalPoly Pomona, Woodbury University, Cornell University, University of Johannesburg, Harvard University, and SoCal NOMAS.

== Awards ==
In 2020, Sean Canty was awarded the Richard Rogers Fellowship established by Harvard University alongside fellow architect Michelle Chang.

The MoMA Young Architects Program shortlisted Canty in 2017 as one of four designers to envision a pavilion for the P.S.1 Museum courtyard.

As part of the annual Times Square Valentines Heart program, Canty was shortlisted to create a design proposal for the 2020 competition.

He was also finalist in the Civitella Ranieri Architecture Prize competition with the focus to invite one emerging architect each year to the Civitella Ranieri Center in Italy. Pin-Up Magazine featured Canty as one of eight emerging firms.
