= Sekou Cooke =

American-Jamaican Hip-hop architect

- Born: Jamaica
- Education: Cornell University; Harvard Graduate School of Design
- Occupation: Architect

Sekou Cooke is an American-Jamaican architect, author and educator, and is associated with the style of Hip-hop architecture. He is the principal of Sekou Cooke Studio. Cooke is one of the founding members of the Black Reconstruction Collective.

== Experience ==
Cooke was born and raised in Jamaica and received a B.Arch from Cornell University and a Master of Architecture degree from Harvard Graduate School of Design. He is a licensed architect in the State of New York. He was an Assistant Professor of Architecture at Syracuse University.

== Awards ==
Cooke received a Faculty Design Award in 2020 by the Association of Collegiate Schools of Architecture (ACSA) and a Graham Foundation Award in 2018 for his project 'Close to the Edge: The Birth of Hip-Hop Architecture'. He is the recipient of the 2017 Architectural League Prize. In 2021 he was named the W.E.B. Du Bois Research Institute fellow. The fellowship is awarded by the W.E.B. Du Bois Research Institute at the Hutchins Center for African & African American Research at Harvard University.

== Work ==
Cooke is the author of the book 'Hip-Hop Architecture' published by Bloomsbury in 2021. His book references the impact of hip-hop culture on the discipline of architecture and the built environment. The content formalizes a close reading of existing and historic design paradigms within creative fields and its impact on underrepresented and black communities. His body of work was shown during a solo exhibition at the Center for Architecture in New York in 2018.

Cooke's selected work is part of the Museum of Modern Art in New York and was included in the 2021 'Reconstructions: Architecture and Blackness in America' exhibition alongside Walter Hood, Germane Barnes, V.Mitch McEwen, Emanuel Admassu and others. It was the first exhibition in the history of MoMA featuring only African-American designers, artists and architects. His project 'We Outchea: Hip Hop Fabrications and Public Space', examined and highlighted the historic demolition of African-American communities by former city planners of Syracuse, NY.

In 2020, Cooke was invited alongside Refik Anadol and Rael San Fratello to envision a memorial for the COVID-19 pandemic. Cooke's proposal named 'Unmonument' was a theoretical approach shifting the notion of a static monument toward the application of in-flux processes instead.

In 2021, he was part of a new pilot program created by the City of Los Angeles to design Accessory Dwelling Units (ADU). Initiated by L.A. mayor Eric Garcetti, the program asked a group of selected architects to envision and design housing units to tackle the cities rising needs for affordable housing while enhancing the city's architectural design ambitions.

== Opinions ==
Cooke had noted Mike Ford claims the origins of Hip-hop architecture lay with both Le Corbusier and Robert Moses, Cooke himself attributes the public works in New York City by Moses were by far the most important foundation.

=== Bibliography ===
- Cooke, Sekou (2011). Hip-hop architecture. London: Bloomsbury Visual Arts. ISBN 9781350116153. OCLC 1242741820.
