= Black Reconstruction Collective =

American organisation celebrating black architecture

- BRC Manifesto at MoMA, deliberately placed to cover signage to the Johnson Gallery
- Abbreviation: BRC
- Website: www.blackreconstructioncollective.org

The Black Reconstruction Collective (BRC) is an American architecture collective. The BRC was formed by participants in the Museum of Modern Art (MoMA) Reconstructions: Architecture and Blackness in America project which was exhibited in the spring of 2021.

== History ==
=== Formation ===
The immediate origins sprung from a 2018 meeting between Sean Anderson, an MoMA curator, and Mabel O. Wilson, author of the essay White by Design from Among Others: Blackness at Moma, from which resulted in MoMA curators asking the questions: “How can architecture address a user that has never been accurately defined? How do we construct blackness?”. This led to an inaugural meeting in September 2019 to discuss the planned Reconstructions: Architecture and Blackness in America at the MoMA with ten potential exhibitors resolved to form the BRC, being inspired by a presentation from Saidiya Hartman and Tina Campt and their formation of the Practicing Refusal Collective Black feminist forum. The BRC was formed by Emanuel Admassu, Germane Barnes, Sekou Cooke, J. Yolande Daniels, Felecia Davis, Mario Gooden, Walter Hood, Olalekan Jeyifous, V. Mitch McEwen, and Amanda Williams and all placed newly commissioned works in the exhibition.

=== Reconstructions exhibition ===
The Reconstructions: Architecture and Blackness in America exhibition opened at the MoMA in February 2021 and ran through to 31 May 2021. A notable exhibit was a large-scale fabric-printed BRC manifesto covering and disrupting directions to the galleries that bore the name of Philip Johnson, the controversial original director of the architecture and design department of the MoMA who espoused racist and white supremacist views in his youth, and failed to include a single Black architect or designer in MoMA's collection during his 6 decade tenure.

The Barnes work A Spectrum of Blackness: The Search for Sedimentation in Miami explores locations in that city such as beaches which Black diaspora helped build and were not allowed to access; and how these can be seen as places of "possibility" and "community".

We Outchea: Hip-Hop Fabrications and Public Space by Cooke uses a concrete stoop (staircase) to depict how the community responded to the division caused by the building of Interstate 81 in Syracuse, New York.

Shaw of The Guardian observed Afrofuturism and speculation are themes that are present in many of the Reconstruction works, and illustrated Hoods Black Towers/Black Power envisaging a future for San Pablo Avenue in Oakland, California, a central point for the Black Panther Party, the party's ten points mapping to ten towers on proposed building sites of nonprofit organizations.

Myer's of The Architect's Newspaper notes almost all of Reconstruction's work "directly incorporates or gestures toward a kind of cartography", exampling Daniels’s black city: The Los Angeles Edition as an overt pair mapping between wireframe isometric maps paired with information of the associated neighborhood printed in gold filigree.

=== Post exhibition ===
During the exhibition the BRC has used talks, lectures and interactive discussions to on subjects including environmental justice, architecture of Black futures, and the possible shape of architecture of reparations. Funds raised have been used to support the annual budget with future plans to grant other Black spatial practitioners.

== Mission ==
Shaw of The Guardian newspaper quotes the collective's objects is “take up the question of what architecture can be – not a tool for imperialism and subjugation, not a means for aggrandizing the self, but a vehicle for liberation and joy”.

== See also ==
- Black Reconstruction in America, a 1935 book by W. E. B. Du Bois
