= Olalekan Jeyifous =

Nigerian artist (born 1977)

Olalekan Jeyifous (born 1977), commonly known as Lek (pronounced "Lake"), is a Nigerian-born visual artist based in Brooklyn, New York. He is currently a visiting lecturer at Cornell University, where he also received his Bachelor of Architecture in 2000. Trained as an architect, his career primarily focuses on public and commercial art. His work has been newly commissioned for the Reconstructions: Architecture and Blackness in America exhibition at the Museum of Modern Art in New York along with Amanda Williams, Walter Hood, and Mario Gooden. The exhibition explores the relationship between architecture and the spaces of African American and African diaspora communities and ways in which histories can be made visible and equity can be built.

== Art career ==
Jeyifous' work confronts social issues through installations, large scale murals, large-scale public artwork and 3D computer models reflecting ideas about Afrofuturism and architectural dystopias. Jeyifous has an interest in urban issues and the changing role cities play in politics, art, pop culture, and the collective imagination. For his exhibition featured in the Museum of Modern Art's show, “Reconstructions: Architecture and Blackness in America,” Jeyifous explores dystopian realities rooted in the black diaspora and the disappearing urban ephemera and architecture of Brooklyn.

In 2020, The New York Times named Jeyifous as one of five artists to follow on Instagram among fellow artists Kara Walker, Phyllis Galembo, Laylah Amatullah Barrayn, Alex Webb and Rebecca Norris Webb.

=== Crown Ether ===
Crown Ether was a 50-foot-tall sculpture at the 2017 Coachella Valley Music and Art Festival. Jeyifous was one of five artists chosen for the exhibition. The elevated art piece was inspired by the relationship between connection and separation. The artist separated the mythical sky-bound luxury high-rise from the less upscale but heritage-rich community below, while connecting the two communities through the benefits of safety and shade.

=== "Protest!" ===
“Protest!” (2017) is a 10-foot-tall public art piece consisting of four large sculptures in Public Square in downtown Cleveland, Ohio. Inspired by the history of protest, peace rallies, and civic gatherings that have taken place in Public Square, Jeyifous painted vivid orange and yellow steel silhouettes that depict protesters shouting into bullhorns, handing out leaflets, and embracing. The piece represents protest as a democratic right by welcoming visitors to sit on or gather around the built-in seating platforms at the base of each piece.

=== The Boom and the Bust ===
The Boom and the Bust (2019) is a 25-foot-tall sculpture that resembles an abstracted high-rise building with a cage-like structure in the center holding a collection of small red houses. The piece references the challenges of housing discrimination and urban inequality, past, and present.

=== Wrought, Knit, Labors, Legacies ===
Wrought, Knit, Labors, Legacies (2020) is an installation on Alexandria Virginia's waterfront that frames Alexandria's African-American history through the lens of the city's industrial and merchant history from the 17th to 20th centuries.

=== Our Destiny, Our Democracy ===
Our Destiny, Our Democracy (2020) will be a collaborative piece with artist Amanda Williams for the inaugural She Built NYC. The piece commemorates Shirley Chisholm, the first black woman to serve in Congress. The artist designed the piece to redefine the 21st-century monument, honor Shirley Chisholm's legacy of bringing people together, and discuss the long arc of democracy. It will be constructed in Brooklyn's Prospect Park at the corner of Ocean and Parkside Avenues.

=== Canyon Dreamscape ===
Canyon Dreamscape (2021) is a large aluminum panel mural made in collaboration with the Los Angeles County Department of Arts and Culture and TFN Architectural Signage. It is located on the Olive View Restorative Care Village in the Olive View–UCLA Medical Center in Sylmar, Los Angeles. It is inspired by the landscape and vegetation of surrounding Wilson Canyon and is based on the connection between nature and well-being. Jeyifous used a "playful and vibrant" color palette "without being harsh and distracting" sublimated onto ALTO Aluminum panels.

== Awards ==
- He was selected with Jennifer Bonner and Walter Hood as the 2021 Architecture & Design fellows for the United States Artists.
- Jeyifous was awarded the 2020-2021 J. Irwin and Xenia S. Miller Prize by Exhibit Columbus for his contribution to the disciplines of design, art and architecture.
