= Mabel O. Wilson =

American architect

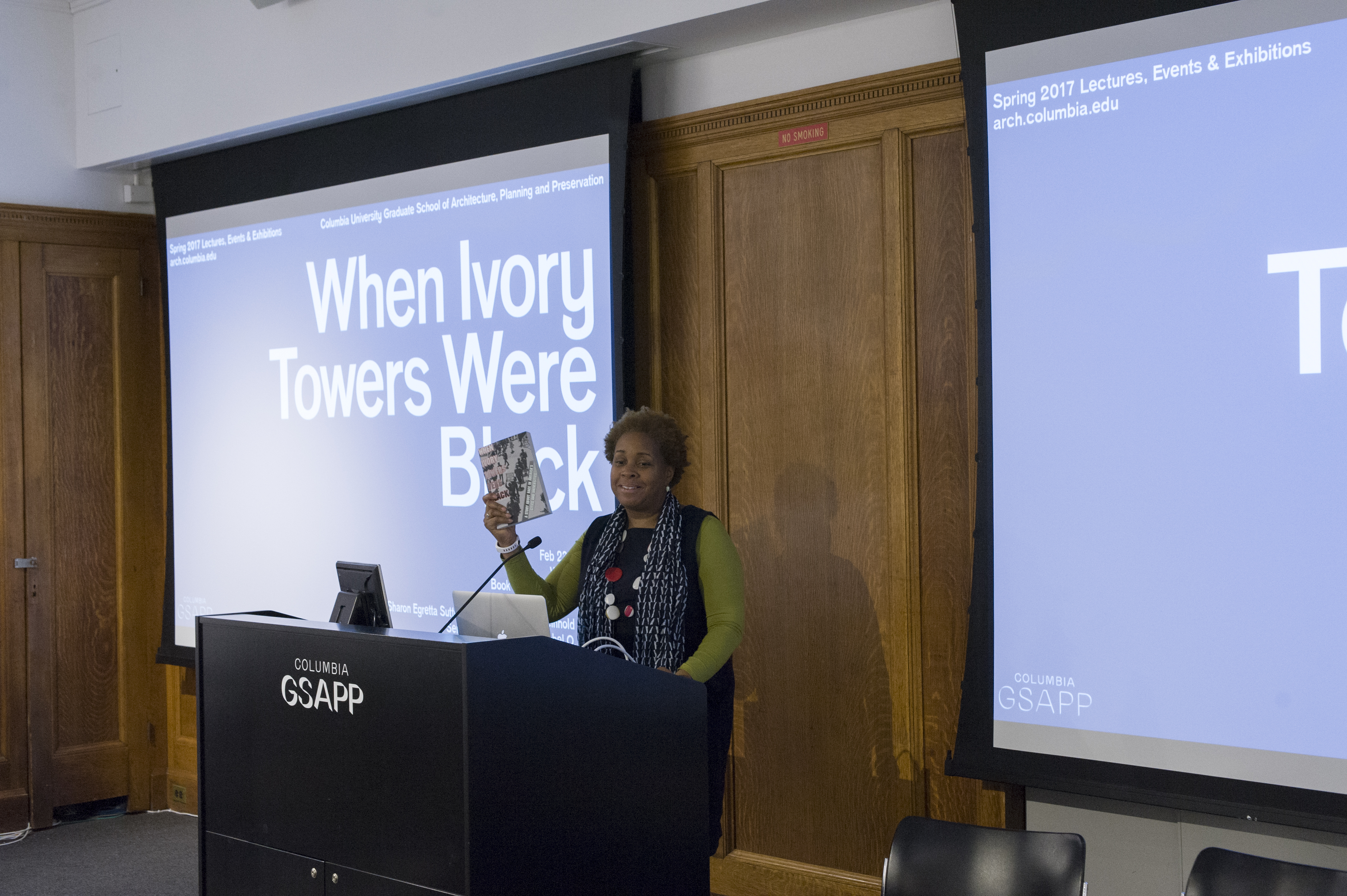
- Mabel O. Wilson at the book launch for When Ivory Towers were Black at Columbia GSAPP
- Born: 1963 (age 62–63); Atlanta Georgia
- Education: University of Virginia (BA); Columbia University (MArch); New York University (PhD)
- Occupation: Architect

Mabel O. Wilson (born 1963) is an American architect, designer, and scholar. She is the founder of Studio& and a professor at the Columbia University Graduate School of Architecture, Planning, and Preservation.

== Education ==
Wilson received a Bachelor of Science in Architecture at the University of Virginia in 1985, a Master's of Architecture at Columbia University in 1991, and a Ph.D. in American Studies from New York University in 2007.

== Career ==
Wilson is the co-founder of Studio &, an architecture firm exploring different facets of art, architecture, and cultural history. Her research and writing explore race in contemporary art, film, and new media; the social production of space; and politics and cultural memory in Black America.

Wilson is the Nancy and George Rupp Professor at the Columbia University Graduate School of Architecture, Planning and Preservation and is also a professor in the African American and African Diasporic Studies Department. She serves as the director of the Institute for Research in African American Studies and co-directs Global Africa Lab.

She has taught courses in architectural design, history, and theory since 2007. Also at Columbia, she is the Director of the Institute for Research in African American Studies (IRAAS) and, alongside Mario Gooden, is the co-director of Global Africa Lab (GAL). Wilson is a founding member of Who Builds Your Architecture? (WBYA?)—a project that examines "the links between labor, architecture and the global networks that form around building buildings."

In 2017, Wilson participated in the Performa 17 biennial. Alongside Bryony Roberts, Wilson explored the legacies of organized forms of marching in African American communities. The two architects collaborated with the Marching Cobras to create Marching On (2017).

In 2021, Wilson co-organized the 'Reconstructions: Architecture and Blackness in America' exhibition at The Museum of Modern Art in New York. It is the first exhibition at MoMA to feature a collective body of work by 10 African-American architects, artists and designers trying to “reclaim the larger civic promise of architecture,” as stated by the New York Times.

== Books ==
Wilson has written books including Race and Modern Architecture: A Critical History from the Enlightenment to the Present (Co-Editor with Irene Cheng and Charles L. Davis II), forthcoming from University of Pittsburgh Press, 2020 (ISBN 978-0-822-94605-2), Begin with the Past: Building the National Museum of African American History and Culture, Smithsonian Institution, 2016 (ISBN 978-1-588-34569-1), and Negro Building: Black Americans in the World of Fairs and Museums, University of California Press, 2012 (ISBN 978-0-520-26842-5).

== Awards and honors ==
- 2021: Society of Architectural Historians (SAH) Class of Fellows
- 2019: American Academy of Arts and Letters Award in Architecture
- 2019: Educator/Mentor honor from Architectural Record's Women in Architecture Design Leadership Program
- 2015–16: Ailsa Mellon Bruce Senior Fellow at the National Gallery of Art's Center for Advanced Study in Visual Arts (CASVA)
- 2011: United States Artists Ford Fellow in Architecture and Design
