= Kitty Foster =

African American property owner

Catherine "Kitty" Foster (c. 1790–1863) was a freed African American woman, notable for having owned property just to the south of the University of Virginia from 1833 until her death in 1863. Her homestead is now a historic site on the campus of the University of Virginia, known as the Foster Site.

== Early life in slavery ==
Catherine Foster, who became known as "Kitty," was born enslaved in Albemarle County, Virginia, between 1790 and 1795. The slaver who owned her was likely the white farmer Henry Foster, and later his widow Elizabeth Foster. There is no historical record of her parents and little record of her life in slavery.

== Freedom and life in Canada, Virginia ==
Foster had a daughter, Sarah, around 1816, followed by her sons German Evans in 1817 and Burwell Evans in 1820. By 1820 she was free and was living as a renter in the nearby African American community of Canada, Virginia, which grew and persisted despite an 1806 act mandating that newly free African Americans leave Virginia within 12 months of obtaining their freedom. In the 1830 federal census, she was listed as white, indicating that she may have been fathered by a white man and had a light-skinned complexion. That year, she had another daughter, Ann Foster. Her children's father or fathers are not recorded.

In December 1833, Foster purchased just over 2 acres (0.81 ha) of land from John Winn, a white merchant, and his wife Mary. It was very rare for African American women to own property at this time. She lived on the homestead for 30 years, making a living as a seamstress and washing clothes for students and faculty at the university. This practice was the subject of criticism from the school's proctor and other authorities at the university, who resented the presence of free African Americans.

In 1834, Foster's home came under attack by students, described by the university as simply "disorderly," who threw flower pots and attempted to force their way into her home. In 1837, she was accused by the university of storing students' firearms, as they were not allowed to carry them on campus.

Her property was assessed as being worth $450 in 1850, but by 1860 its value had risen to $4,000.

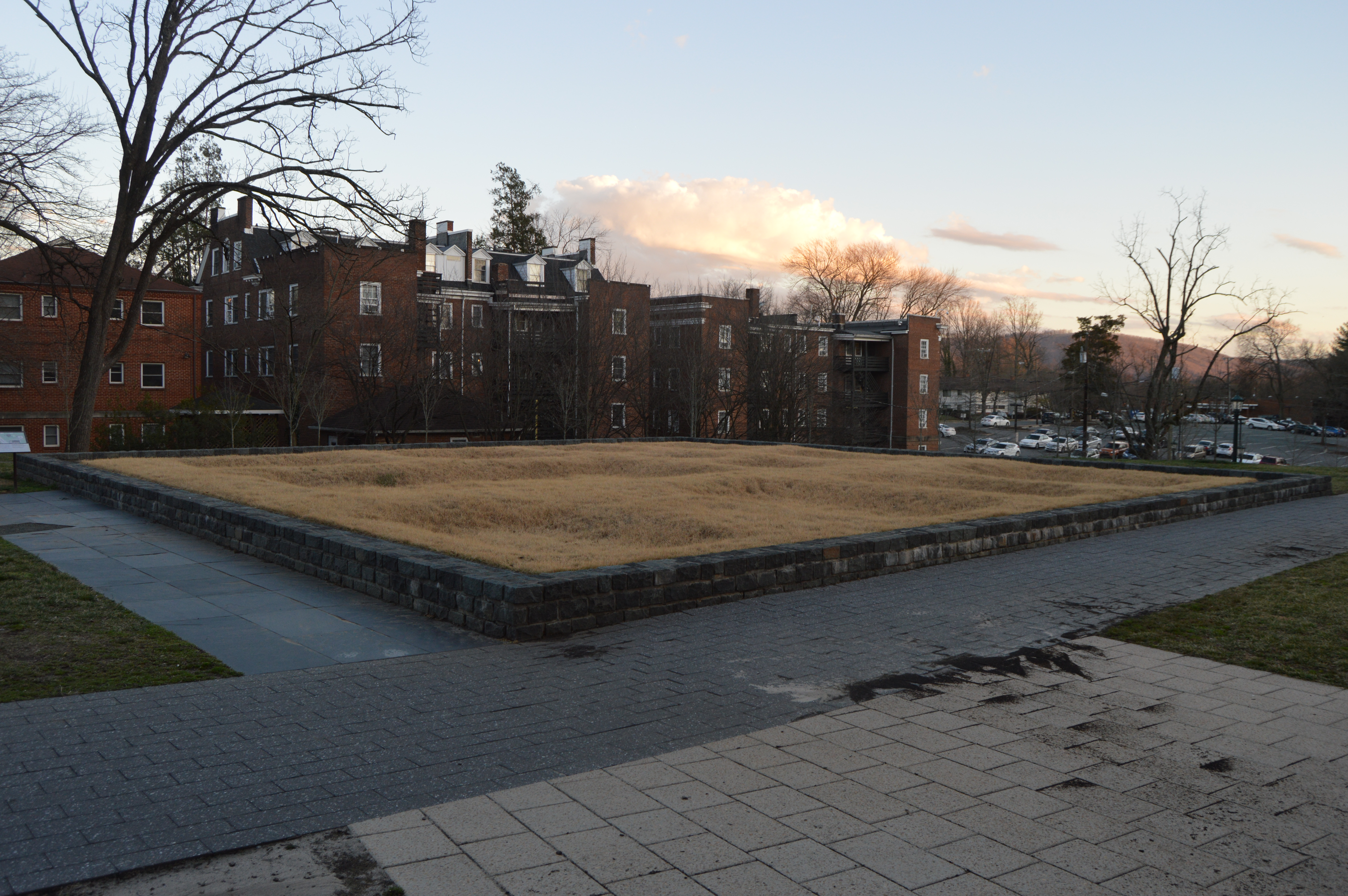
The graveyard at the Foster Site, which is listed on the National Register of Historic Places.

== Death and legacy ==
Kitty Foster died in 1863 and was buried in what was likely a community graveyard on her land. Her family lived on the property for three more generations, all led by women, until 1906.

The home there was demolished in the early 20th century by its new owners, who were white developers, and a new house was built there in the 1920s; it was later torn down during construction in 2009. The new house was built over the graveyard, despite language in the deed aiming to ensure the graves would be moved.

The property was sold to the University of Virginia in 1976. In 1993, archeologists discovered the cemetery on what was once Foster's land, in which she and some three dozen others were buried. Since 2011, her homestead has been a memorial and historic site on the campus of the University of Virginia, known as the Foster Site.
