= Benjamin Samuel =

German-American architect and artist

Benjamin Samuel Koren, also known as Benjamin Samuel (born 1981) is a German-American architect and artist whose work applies computational methods across both disciplines. He founded One to One, a computational design and digital fabrication studio, and developed the computational process used to generate the acoustic-panel geometry for the Grand Hall of the Elbphilharmonie in Hamburg.

== Early life and education ==
Koren was born in Frankfurt am Main in 1981 and grew up in Frankfurt and Miami. He studied at New York University, the University of Miami, the University of Applied Arts Vienna, and the Architectural Association School of Architecture in London.

At the Architectural Association, his diploma project, Harmonic Proportion in Amorphic Form: A Music Pavilion in Hyde Park, London, used mathematical and harmonic relationships in architectural design. In 2005, the project was commended in the Bronze Medal category of the RIBA President's Medals and also received the iGuzzini Travel Award and a SOM Foundation traveling fellowship.

== Architecture ==
After his studies, Koren worked at Arup's Advanced Geometry Unit in London and later for Herzog & de Meuron in Basel. He founded One to One in Frankfurt in 2009. A New York office followed in 2016. Through One to One, Koren has developed project-specific computational methods for complex architectural and fabrication problems, translating design requirements into geometry and production data.

From 2009 to 2017, Koren developed the computational process used to generate the geometry of the interior acoustic panels for the Grand Hall of the Elbphilharmonie. He translated acoustic requirements developed by Yasuhisa Toyota, together with architectural and fabrication constraints, into parameters for an algorithm that produced an individual surface pattern for each of the hall's 10,000 gypsum-fiber panels. Together, the panels contain approximately one million unique sound-diffusing cells. Koren also developed the fabrication data for the system, including individual digital files used to CNC-mill the panels.

Koren's work through One to One has also included geometric and environmental modeling for the Louvre Abu Dhabi, acoustic modeling for the Philharmonie de Paris for Jean Nouvel, production geometry for a pavilion by Zaha Hadid, and algorithmic planning for sculptures by Jeff Koons.

== Art ==
Under the artist name Benjamin Samuel, Koren creates visual and sculptural artworks using computational processes.

His light-installation series Arrays of Light reconfigures source materials ranging from music, film, literary texts, and comic books to financial-market data into light-box compositions governed by distinct synesthetic systems of color, sequence, and proportion. In Goldberg Variationen 30+2, Koren translated the complete musical structure of Johann Sebastian Bach's Goldberg Variations into a color-based composition; the related Diabelli Variationen 33+1 extends the same approach to Ludwig van Beethoven's Diabelli Variations. The Beethoven-House in Bonn acquired Diabelli Variationen 33+1 for its museum in 2019. That same year, the Bach House in Eisenach acquired Goldberg Variationen 30+2, which remains part of the museum's permanent exhibition.

The film-based works Hitchcock 30 and Kubrick 13 translate the visual structure of the directors' filmographies into color-based compositions derived from regularly sampled frames across all of their feature films. The Deutsches Filmmuseum in Frankfurt acquired both works in 2012.

In 2015, the German art publisher Distanz released Arrays of Light – Benjamin Samuel, a book devoted to Koren's work, with a foreword by art historian Henry Keazor.

Koren's sculptural series Harmonics uses computational processes generatively, deriving three-dimensional forms from proportional systems including the Golden Ratio and the Fibonacci sequence.

== Selected publications ==
- Imbert, Frédéric; Kathryn Stutts Frost; Al Fisher; Andrew Witt; Vincent Tourre; and Benjamin S. Koren. Concurrent Geometric, Structural and Environmental Design: Louvre Abu Dhabi. In Advances in Architectural Geometry 2012, Springer, 2013, pp. 77–90. DOI: 10.1007/978-3-7091-1251-9_6.
- Benjamin Samuel and Henry Keazor. …wie die Ringe des Saturn: Ein Gespräch mit Benjamin Samuel vor seinen Werken Hitchcock 30 und Kubrick 13+9+10 im Frankfurter Filmmuseum. In Henry Keazor (ed.), Hitchcock und die Künste, Schüren Verlag, 2013, pp. 33–47. ISBN 978-3-89472-828-1.
- Benjamin Samuel. Arrays of Light. Distanz, Berlin, 2015. ISBN 978-3-95476-126-5.
- Koren, Benjamin S.; Tobias Müller. Digital Fabrication of Non-Standard Sound-Diffusing Panels in the Large Hall of the Elbphilharmonie. In Fabricate 2017, UCL Press, 2017, pp. 122–129. DOI: 10.2307/j.ctt1n7qkg7.20.
- Koren, Benjamin S. The Grand Hall of the Elbphilharmonie Hamburg: Development of Parametric and Digital Fabrication Tools in Architectural and Acoustical Design. In Humanizing Digital Reality, Springer, 2018, pp. 141–151. DOI: 10.1007/978-981-10-6611-5_13.
