= Vince Proby =

African American artist and architect

Vincent J. Proby (1928–1987) was an artist and architect in the United States. Tulane University has a collection of his papers at its Amistad Research Center.

== Early life ==
Proby was born in Wichita County, Texas and moved with his family to Los Angeles. He studied at Los Angeles high schools, Los Angeles Junior College, and University of Southern California.

== Career ==
He was project manager for several large projects before establishing his own architectural firm.

He was the first African American to serve on California's State Board of Architectural Examiners.

Proby designed the A. C. Bilbrew Public Library including its interior colored glass ornamentation. He was photographed at the library in 1984 next to Frances E. Williams as she was honored by Kenneth Hahn. He was also photographed at the Paul R. Williams tribute event in 1973 by Thelner B. Hoover.

== Work ==
- Howard Family home in Ladera Heights
- West Bleacher Structure (1968)
- A. C. Bilbrew Public Library in Willowbrook, Los Angeles (1974)
- California African American Museum with Jack Haywood in Willowbrook (1984)
- The Teasley Residence
