= Shirley Chisholm =

American politician (1924–2005)

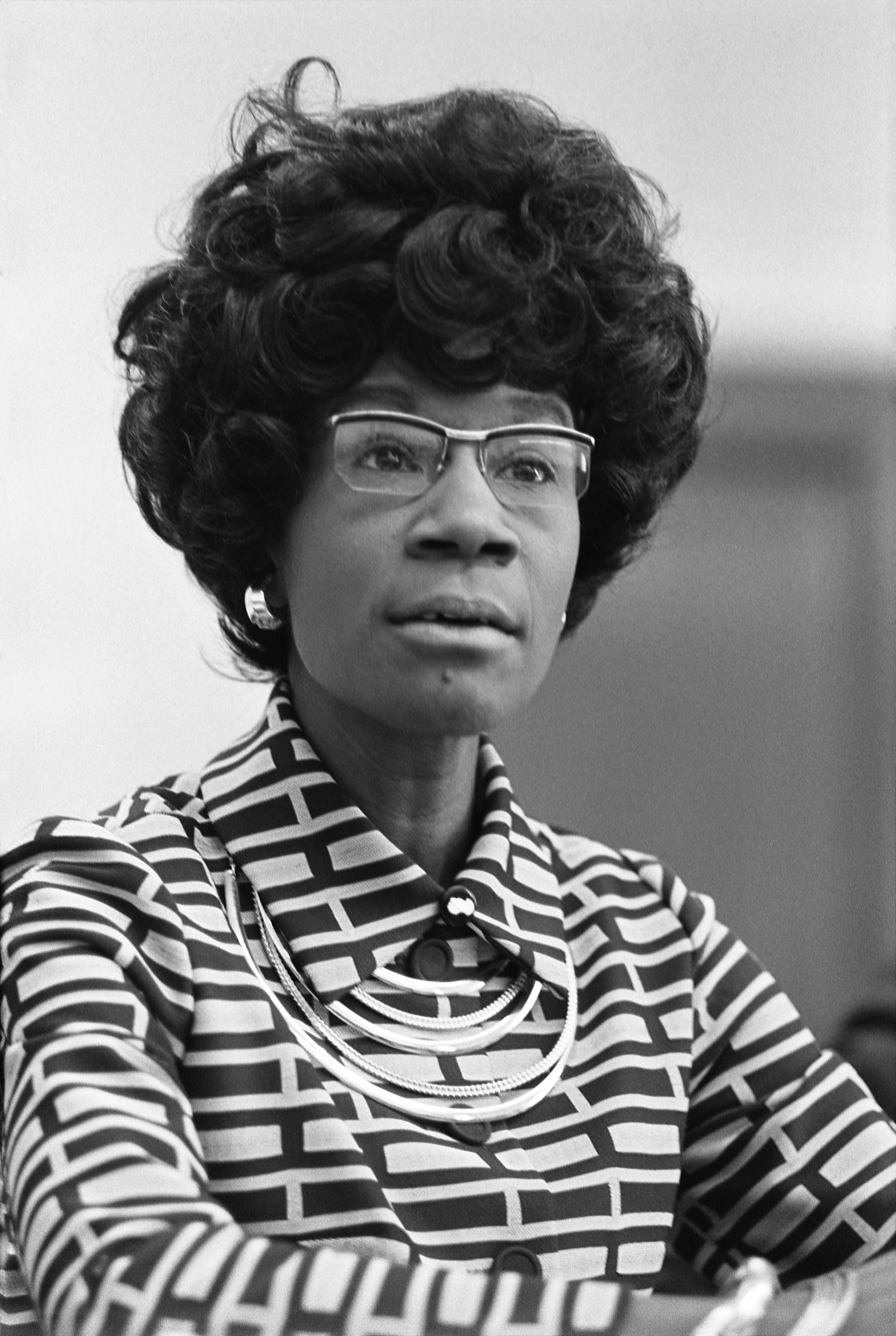
- Chisholm in 1972

Secretary of the House Democratic Caucus
- In office January 3, 1977 – January 3, 1981
- Leader: Tip O'Neill
- Preceded by: Patsy Mink
- Succeeded by: Geraldine Ferraro

Member of the U.S. House of Representatives from New York's 12th district
- In office January 3, 1969 – January 3, 1983
- Preceded by: Edna Kelly
- Succeeded by: Major Owens

Member of the New York State Assembly
- In office January 1, 1965 – December 31, 1968
- Preceded by: Thomas Jones
- Succeeded by: Thomas R. Fortune
- Constituency: 17th district (1965); 45th district (1966); 55th district (1967–1968)

Personal details
- Born: Shirley Anita St. Hill; November 30, 1924 Brooklyn, New York City, U.S.
- Died: January 1, 2005 (aged 80) Ormond Beach, Florida, U.S.
- Resting place: Forest Lawn Cemetery
- Party: Democratic
- Spouses: Conrad Chisholm (m. 1949; div. 1977); Arthur Hardwick Jr. (m. 1977; died 1986)
- Education: Brooklyn College (BA); Columbia University (MA)

Shirley Anita Chisholm (/ˈtʃɪzəm/ CHIZ-əm; née St. Hill; November 30, 1924 – January 1, 2005) was an American politician who, in 1968, became the first black woman to be elected to the United States Congress. Chisholm represented New York's 12th congressional district, a district centered in Bedford–Stuyvesant, Brooklyn (Note: At various times, the district also included parts of the surrounding neighborhoods of Brownsville, Bushwick, Crown Heights and East New York. For her final two terms in office, the district stretched as far north as Newtown Creek.) for seven terms from 1969 to 1983. In 1972, she became the first black candidate for a major-party nomination for President of the United States and the first woman to run for the Democratic Party's presidential nomination. Throughout her career, she was known for taking "a resolute stand against economic, social, and political injustices", as well as being a strong supporter of black civil rights and women's rights.

Born in Brooklyn, New York City, she spent ages five through nine in Barbados, and she always considered herself a Barbadian American. She excelled at school and earned her degrees in Brooklyn and at Columbia University. She started working in early-childhood education, and she became involved in local Democratic Party politics in the 1950s. In 1964, overcoming resistance because she was a woman, she was elected to the New York State Assembly. Four years later, she was elected to Congress, where she led the expansion of food and nutrition programs for the poor and rose to party leadership. She retired from Congress in 1983 and taught at Mount Holyoke College while continuing her political organizing. Although nominated for the ambassadorship to Jamaica in 1993, health issues caused her to withdraw. Chisholm was posthumously awarded both the Presidential Medal of Freedom and the Congressional Gold Medal.

== Early life and education ==
Shirley Anita St. Hill was born to immigrant parents on November 30, 1924, in Brooklyn, New York City. She was of Afro-Guyanese and Afro-Barbadian descent. She had three younger sisters, two born within three years of her and one later. Her father, Charles Christopher St. Hill, was born in British Guiana before moving to Barbados. He arrived in New York City via Antilla, Cuba, in 1923. Her mother, Ruby Seale, was born in Christ Church, Barbados and arrived in New York City in 1921.

Charles St. Hill was a laborer who worked in a factory that made burlap bags and as a baker's helper. Ruby St. Hill was a skilled seamstress and domestic worker who experienced the difficulty of working outside the home while simultaneously raising her children. As a consequence, in November 1929, when Shirley turned five, she and her two sisters were sent to Barbados on the MS Vulcania to live with their maternal grandmother, Emaline Seale. Shirley later said, "Granny gave me strength, dignity, and love. I learned from an early age that I was somebody. I didn't need the black revolution to teach me that." Shirley and her sisters lived on their grandmother's farm in the Vauxhall village in Christ Church, where Shirley attended a one-room schoolhouse. She returned to the United States in 1934, arriving in New York on May 19 aboard the SS Nerissa. As a result of her time in Barbados, Shirley spoke with a West Indian accent throughout her life. In her 1970 autobiography, Unbought and Unbossed, she wrote: "Years later I would know what an important gift my parents had given me by seeing to it that I had my early education in the strict, traditional, British-style schools of Barbados. If I speak and write easily now, that early education is the main reason." In addition, she belonged to the Quaker Brethren sect found in the West Indies, and religion became important to her; however, later in life, she attended services in a Methodist church. As a result of her time on the island, and despite her U.S. birth, she always would consider herself a Barbadian American.

Beginning in 1939, she attended Girls' High School in the Bedford–Stuyvesant neighborhood of Brooklyn, a highly regarded, integrated school that attracted girls from throughout Brooklyn. She did well academically at Girls' High and was chosen to be vice president of the Junior Arista honor society. She was accepted at and offered scholarships to Vassar College and Oberlin College, but the family could not afford the room-and-board costs to go to either school; instead, she selected Brooklyn College, where there was no charge for tuition and she could live at home and commute to the school.

She earned her Bachelor of Arts from Brooklyn College in 1946, majoring in sociology and minoring in Spanish (a language that she would employ at times during her political career). She won prizes for her debating skills and graduated cum laude. During her time at Brooklyn College, she was a member of Delta Sigma Theta sorority and the Harriet Tubman Society. As a member of the Harriet Tubman Society, she advocated for inclusion (specifically in terms of the integration of black soldiers in the military during World War II), the addition of courses that focused on African-American history and the involvement of more women in the student government. However, this was not her first introduction to activism or politics. Growing up, she was surrounded by politics, as her father was an avid supporter of Marcus Garvey's and a dedicated supporter of the rights of trade union members. She saw her community advocate for its rights as she witnessed the Barbados workers' and anti-colonial independence movements.

She met Conrad O. Chisholm in the late 1940s. He had migrated to the United States from Jamaica in 1946, and he later became a private investigator who specialized in negligence-based lawsuits. They married in 1949 in a large West Indian-style wedding. She subsequently suffered two miscarriages, and, to their disappointment, the couple would have no children; although, in the view of scholar Julie Gallagher, it is possible that her career goals played a role in this outcome as well.

After graduating from college, Chisholm began working as a teacher's aide at the Mt. Calvary Child Care Center in Harlem. She would work at the center in a teaching role from 1946 to 1953. Meanwhile, she was furthering her education, attending classes at night and earning her Master of Arts in childhood education from Teachers College of Columbia University in 1951.

== Early career ==
From 1953 to 1954, she was director of the Friend in Need Nursery, located in Brownsville, Brooklyn, and then, from 1954 to 1959, she was director of the Hamilton-Madison Child Care Center, located in Lower Manhattan. At the latter, there were 130 children between the ages of three and seven, and 24 employees reported to her. From 1959 to 1964, she was an educational consultant for the Division of Day Care in New York City's Bureau of Child Welfare. There, she was in charge of supervising ten day-care centers as well as starting up new ones. She became an authority on early education and child-welfare issues.

Chisholm entered the world of politics in 1953, when she joined Wesley "Mac" Holder's effort to elect Lewis Flagg Jr. to the bench as the first black judge in Brooklyn. The Flagg election group later transformed into the Bedford–Stuyvesant Political League (BSPL). The BSPL pushed candidates to support civil rights, fought against racial discrimination in housing, and sought to improve economic opportunities and services in Brooklyn. Chisholm eventually left the group around 1958 after clashing with Holder over Chisholm's push to give female members of the group more input in decision-making.

She also worked as a volunteer for white-dominated political clubs in Brooklyn, like the Brooklyn Democratic Clubs and the League of Women Voters. With the Political League, she was part of a committee that chose the recipient of its annual Brotherhood Award. She also was a representative of the Brooklyn branch of the National Association of College Women. Furthermore, within the political organizations that she joined, Chisholm sought to make meaningful changes to the structure and make-up of the organizations, specifically the Brooklyn Democratic Clubs, which resulted in her being able to recruit more people of color into the 17th District Club and, thus, local politics.

In 1960, Chisholm joined a new organization, the Unity Democratic Club (UDC), led by former Flagg campaign member Thomas R. Jones. The UDC's membership was mostly middle class, racially integrated, and included women in leadership positions. Chisholm campaigned for Jones, who lost the election for an assembly seat in 1960, but ran again two years later and won, becoming Brooklyn's second black assemblyman.

== State legislator ==
"Young woman, what are you doing out here in this cold? Did you get your husband's breakfast this morning? Did you straighten up your house? What are you doing running for office? This is something for men."

— Chisholm relating what an older African-American man told her at a Brooklyn housing project in 1964 when she was collecting signatures for her nominating petition for state assembly. She calmly explained her experience and commitment to the community, and he ended up signing the petition.

After Jones accepted a judicial appointment rather than seek reelection, Chisholm sought to run for his seat in the New York state assembly in 1964. Chisholm faced resistance based on her sex, with the UDC hesitant to support a female candidate. Chisholm chose to appeal directly to women, including using her role as Brooklyn branch president of Key Women of America to mobilize female voters. Chisholm won the Democratic primary in June 1964. She then won the seat in December with over 18,000 votes over Republican and Liberal Party candidates, neither of whom received more than 1,900 votes.

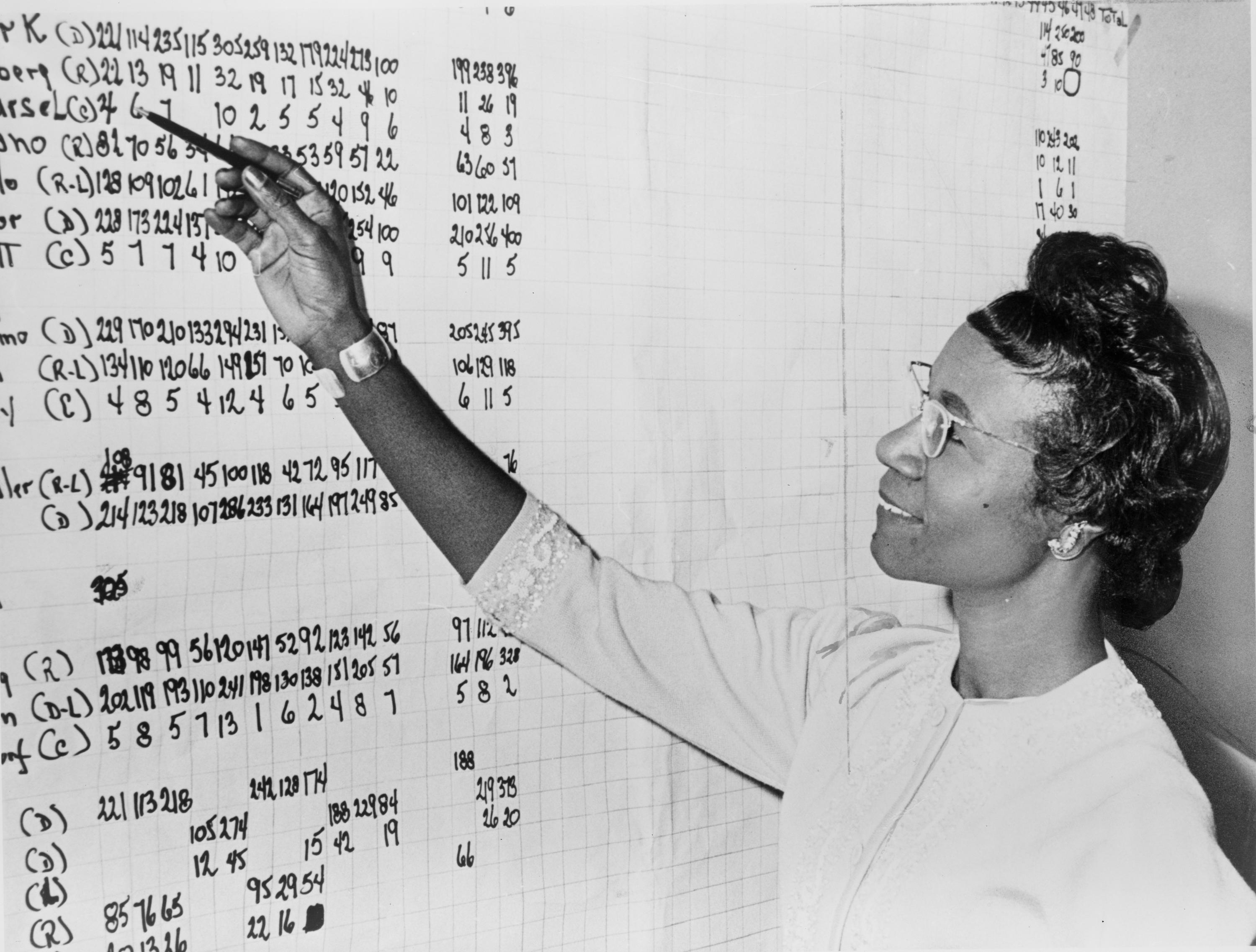
Chisholm reviewing political statistics in 1965

Chisholm was a member of the New York State Assembly from 1965 to 1968, sitting in the 175th, 176th and 177th New York State Legislatures. By May 1965, she had already been honored in a "Salute to Women Doers" affair in New York. One of her early activities in the Assembly was to argue against the state's literacy test requiring English, holding that just because a person "functions better in his native language is no sign a person is illiterate". By early 1966, she was a leader in a push by the statewide Council of Elected Negro Democrats for black representation on key committees in the Assembly.

Her successes in the legislature included getting unemployment benefits extended to domestic workers. She also sponsored the introduction of the state-supported SEEK program (Search for Education, Elevation and Knowledge) at the City University of New York, which provided disadvantaged students with the chance to enter college while receiving intensive remedial education.

In August 1968, she was elected as the Democratic National Committeewoman from New York State.

== U.S. House of Representatives ==
=== Initial election ===
"Ladies and gentlemen, this is fighting Shirley Chisholm coming through."

— Announcement made from a sound truck that drove up to housing projects in Brooklyn during her 1968 campaign.

In 1968, Chisholm ran for the U.S. House of Representatives from New York's 12th congressional district, which, as part of a court-mandated reapportionment plan, had been significantly redrawn to focus on Bedford–Stuyvesant and was thus expected to result in Brooklyn's first black member of Congress. (Note: Adam Clayton Powell Jr. had, in 1945, become the first black member of Congress from New York City as a whole.) As a result of the redrawing, the white incumbent in the former 12th, Representative Edna F. Kelly, sought reelection in a different district. Chisholm announced her candidacy around January 1968 and established some early organizational support. Her campaign slogan was "Unbought and unbossed". In the June 18 Democratic primary, Chisholm defeated two other black opponents, State Senator William S. Thompson and labor official Dollie Robertson. In the general election, she staged an upset victory over James Farmer, the former director of the Congress of Racial Equality, who was running as a Liberal Party candidate with Republican support, winning by an approximately two-to-one margin. Chisholm thereby became the first black woman elected to Congress, and she was the only woman in the first-year class that year.

=== Early terms ===
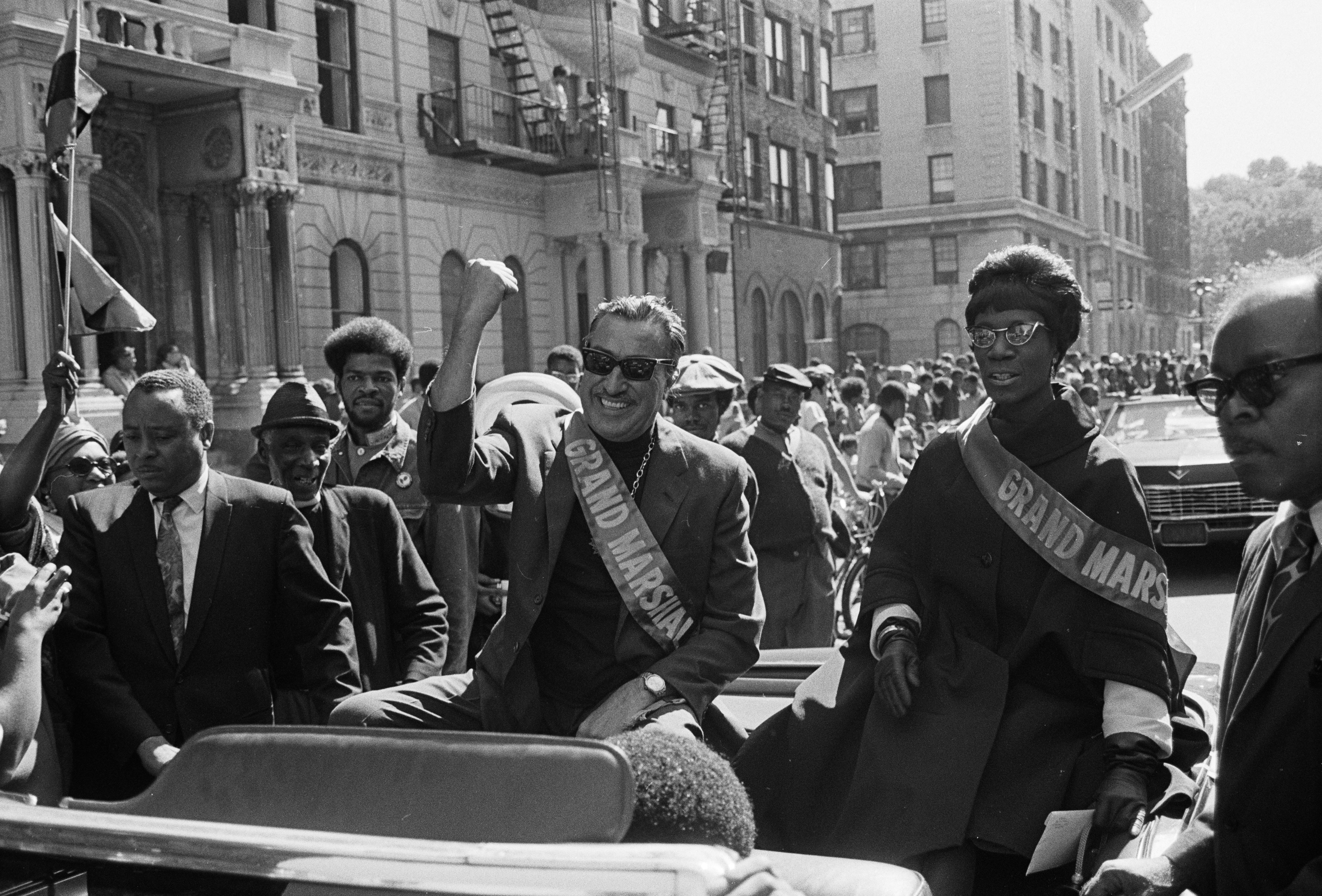
Chisholm and Adam Clayton Powell Jr. serve as Grand Marshals of Harlem's first African American Day Parade, September 21, 1969

Speaker of the House John W. McCormack assigned Chisholm to serve on the House Agriculture Committee. Given her urban district, she felt that the placement was irrelevant to her constituents. When Chisholm confided to Rebbe Menachem M. Schneerson that she was upset and insulted by her assignment, Schneerson suggested that she use the surplus food to help the poor and hungry. Chisholm subsequently met Bob Dole and worked to expand the food-stamp program. She later played a critical role in the creation of the Special Supplemental Nutrition Program for Women, Infants and Children (WIC). Chisholm would credit Schneerson for the fact that so many "poor babies [now] have milk and poor children have food". Chisholm was then also placed on the Veterans' Affairs Committee. Soon after, she voted for Hale Boggs as House Majority Leader over John Conyers. As a reward for her support, Boggs assigned her to the much-prized Education and Labor Committee, which was her preferred committee. She was the third-highest-ranking member of this committee when she retired from Congress.

Initially, Chisholm only hired women for her office; half of them were black. In later years, she did hire some men for both her Washington office and the one in her Brooklyn district. Chisholm said that she had faced much more discrimination during her New York legislative career because she was a woman than for her race.

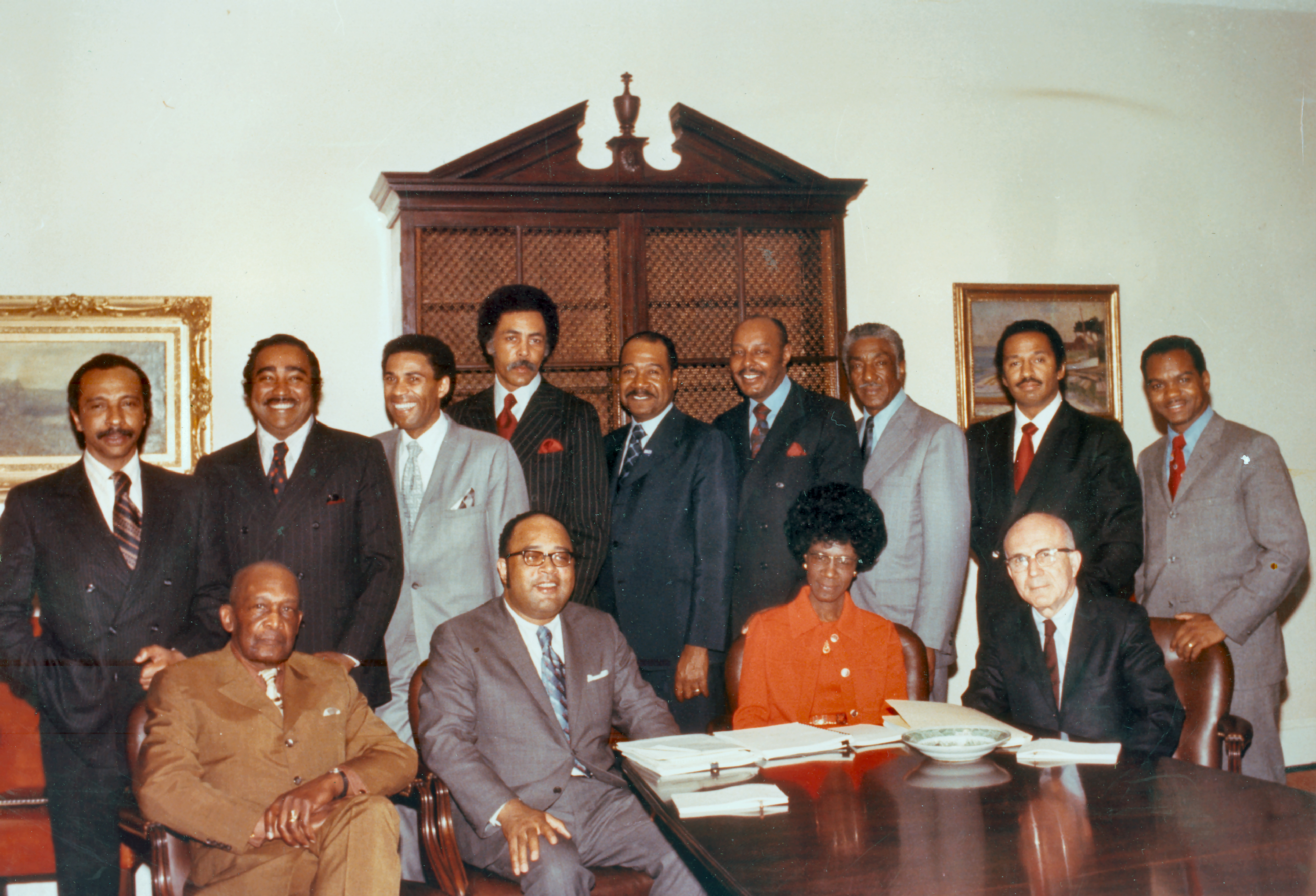
Chisholm (seated, second from right) with fellow founding members of the Congressional Black Caucus in 1971

In 1971, Chisholm served as a founding member of both the Congressional Black Caucus and the National Women's Political Caucus. In January 1971, Chisholm was one of 74 U.S. representatives to co-sponsor the House version of the Health Security Act, a bipartisan universal healthcare bill that supported the creation of a government health insurance program to cover every person in America.

In May 1971, Chisholm and fellow New York Congresswoman Bella Abzug introduced a bill to provide $10 billion in federal funds for child-care services by 1975. A less expensive version introduced by Senator Walter Mondale eventually passed the House and Senate as the Comprehensive Child Development Bill, but it was vetoed in December 1971 by President Richard Nixon, who said that it was too expensive and would undermine the institution of the family.

=== 1972 presidential campaign ===
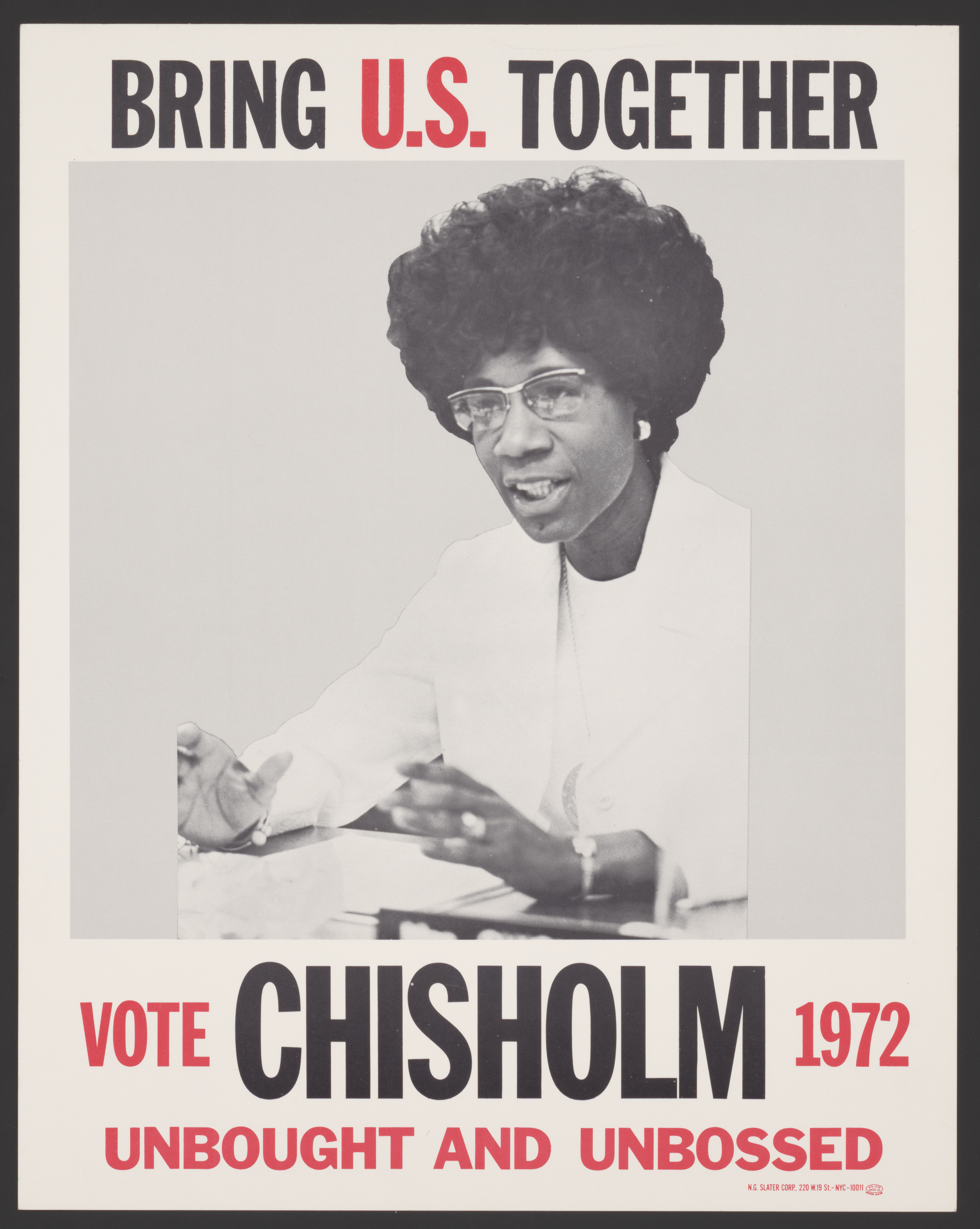
Shirley Chisholm 1972 presidential campaign poster

Chisholm began exploring her candidacy in July 1971 and formally announced her presidential bid on January 25, 1972, in a Baptist church in her district in Brooklyn. There, she called for a "bloodless revolution" at the forthcoming Democratic nominating convention for the 1972 U.S. presidential election. Chisholm became the first African American to run for a major party's nomination for President of the United States, making her also the first woman ever to run for the Democratic Party's presidential nomination (U.S. Senator Margaret Chase Smith having previously run for the 1964 Republican presidential nomination). In her announcement, Chisholm described herself as representative of the people and offered a new articulation of American identity: "I am not the candidate of black America, although I am black and proud. I am not the candidate of the women's movement of this country, although I am a woman and equally proud of that. I am the candidate of the people and my presence before you symbolizes a new era in American political history."

Her campaign was underfunded, only spending $300,000 in total. She also struggled to be regarded as a serious candidate instead of as a symbolic political figure; the Democratic political establishment ignored her, and her black male colleagues provided little support. She later said, "When I ran for the Congress, when I ran for president, I met more discrimination as a woman than for being black. Men are men." In particular, she expressed frustration about the "black matriarch thing", saying, "They think I am trying to take power from them. The black man must step forward, but that doesn't mean the black woman must step back." Her husband, however, was fully supportive of her candidacy and said, "I have no hangups about a woman running for president." Security was also a concern, as, during the campaign, three confirmed threats were made against her life; Conrad Chisholm served as her bodyguard until U.S. Secret Service protection was given to her in May 1972.

Chisholm skipped the initial March 7 New Hampshire contest, instead focusing on the March 14 Florida primary, which she thought would be receptive due to its "blacks, youth, and a strong women's movement". But, due to organizational difficulties and Congressional responsibilities, she only made two campaign trips there and ended with 3.5 percent of the vote for a seventh-place finish. Chisholm had difficulties gaining ballot access, but campaigned or received votes in primaries in fourteen states. Her largest number of votes came in the June 6 California primary, where she received 157,435 votes for 4.4 percent and a fourth-place finish, while her best percentage in a competitive primary came in the May 6 North Carolina contest, where she got 7.5 percent for a third-place finish. Overall, she won 28 delegates during the primaries process itself. Chisholm's base of support was ethnically diverse and included the National Organization for Women. Betty Friedan and Gloria Steinem attempted to run as Chisholm delegates in New York. Altogether, during the primary season, she received 430,703 votes, which was 2.7 percent of the total of nearly 16 million cast and represented seventh place among the Democratic contenders. In June, Chisholm became the first woman to appear in a United States presidential debate.

At the 1972 Democratic National Convention in Miami Beach, Florida, there were still efforts taking place by the campaign of former Vice President Hubert Humphrey to stop the nomination of Senator George McGovern for president. After that failed and McGovern's nomination was assured, as a symbolic gesture, Humphrey released his black delegates to Chisholm. This, combined with defections from disenchanted delegates from other candidates, as well as the delegates that she had won in the primaries, gave her a total of 152 first-ballot votes for the presidential nomination during the July 12 roll call. (Her precise total was 151.95.) Her largest support overall came from Ohio, with 23 delegates (slightly more than half of them white), even though she had not been on the ballot in the May 2 primary there. Her total gave her fourth place in the roll-call tally, behind McGovern's winning total of 1,728 delegates. Chisholm said that she ran for office "in spite of hopeless odds ... to demonstrate the sheer will and refusal to accept the status quo".

It is sometimes stated that Chisholm won a primary in 1972, or won three states overall, with New Jersey, Louisiana and Mississippi being so identified. None of these fit the usual definition of winning a plurality of the contested popular vote or delegate allocations at the time of a state primary, caucus or state convention. In the June 6 New Jersey primary, there was a complex ballot that featured both a delegate-selection vote and a non-binding, non-delegate-producing "beauty contest" presidential preference vote. In the delegate-selection vote, Democratic front-runner McGovern defeated his main rival at that point, Humphrey, and won the large share of available delegates. Of the Democratic candidates, only Chisholm and former North Carolina governor Terry Sanford were on the statewide preference ballot. Sanford had withdrawn from the contest three weeks earlier. In that non-binding preference tally, which the Associated Press described as "meaningless", Chisholm received the majority of votes: 51,433, which was 66.9 percent. During the actual balloting at the national convention, Chisholm received votes from only 4 of New Jersey's 109 delegates, with 89 going to McGovern.

Chisholm (right) posing for a photograph with Florida State Rep. Gwen Cherry at the 1972 Democratic National Convention

In the May 13 Louisiana caucuses, there was a battle between forces of McGovern and Alabama governor George Wallace; nearly all of the delegates chosen were those who identified as uncommitted, many of them black. Leading up to the convention, McGovern was thought to control 20 of Louisiana's 44 delegates, with most of the rest uncommitted. During the actual roll call at the national convention, Louisiana passed at first, then cast 18.5 of its 44 votes for Chisholm, with the next-best finishers being McGovern and Senator Henry M. Jackson with 10.25 each. As one delegate explained, "Our strategy was to give Shirley our votes for sentimental reasons on the first ballot. However, if our votes would have made the difference, we would have gone with McGovern." In Mississippi, there were two rival party factions that each selected delegates at their own state conventions and caucuses: "regulars", representing the mostly white state Democratic Party, and "loyalists", representing many blacks and white liberals. Each slate professed to be largely uncommitted, but the regulars were thought to favor Wallace and the loyalists McGovern. By the time of the national convention, the loyalists were seated following a credentials challenge, and their delegates were characterized as mostly supporting McGovern, with some support for Humphrey. During the convention, some McGovern delegates became angry about what they saw as statements from McGovern that backed away from his commitment to end U.S. involvement in Southeast Asia, and cast protest votes for Chisholm as a result. During the actual balloting, Mississippi went in the first half of the roll call, and cast 12 of its 25 votes for Chisholm, with McGovern coming next with 10 votes.

During the campaign, the German filmmaker Peter Lilienthal shot the documentary film Shirley Chisholm for President for the German television channel ZDF.

=== Later terms ===
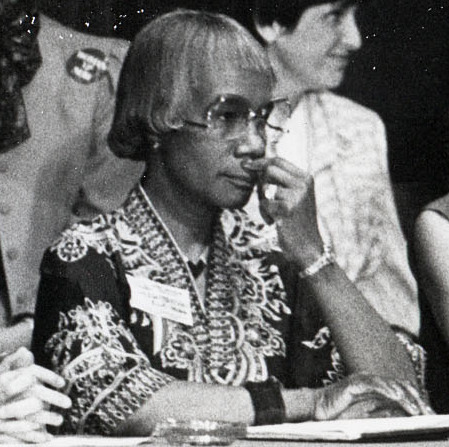
Chisholm at the 1984 Democratic National Convention

Chisholm created controversy when she visited rival and ideological opposite George Wallace in the hospital soon after his shooting in May 1972, during the presidential primary campaign. Several years later, when Chisholm worked on a bill to give domestic workers the right to a minimum wage, Wallace helped gain votes from enough Southern congressmen to push the legislation through the House.

From 1977 to 1981, during the 95th Congress and 96th Congress, Chisholm served as Secretary of the Democratic Caucus.

Throughout her tenure in Congress, Chisholm worked to improve opportunities for inner-city residents. She supported spending increases for education, health care and other social services. She was very concerned with instances of discrimination against women, especially impoverished women. She also focused on land rights for Native Americans.

In the area of national security and foreign policy, Chisholm worked for the revocation of Internal Security Act of 1950. She opposed the American involvement in the Vietnam War and the expansion of weapon developments. She was a vocal opponent of the U.S. military draft. During the Jimmy Carter administration, she called for better treatment of Haitian refugees.

She was a forceful advocate for the Equal Rights Amendment, believing that the initial value of passing it would be in the social and psychological effects that it would have more than any economic or legal impact. She did not want the amendment modified to incorporate a provision that would permit laws that purportedly protected the health and safety of women, saying such a modification would continue a traditional avenue of discrimination against women. Regarding a specific argument made along these lines, that the amendment would require women to be subject to the draft, Chisholm was unperturbed, saying that if there was a draft, women could serve, and that some larger, stronger women might perform better in infantry roles than some smaller, weaker men.

At the same time, Chisholm was aware of how much of second-wave feminism in the United States focused on the concerns of middle-class white women, such as the adoption of the term "Ms." At the 1973 convention of the National Women's Political Caucus, Chisholm said that "women of color" were faced with "double discrimination" that especially affected them economically, and that the women's movement needed to make changes to reflect better such women and their concerns. Scholar Julie Gallagher has written that Chisholm's pressure in this regard did make some difference in the focus of the women's movement later in the 1970s.

Chisholm's first marriage ended in a divorce, which was granted on February 4, 1977, in the Dominican Republic. Later that year, on November 26, she married Arthur Hardwick Jr., a former New York State Assemblyman whom Chisholm had known when they both served in that body and who was now a Buffalo, New York, liquor-store owner. The ceremony was held in a Buffalo-area hotel. She indicated that while her legal name was now Hardwick, she would continue to use Chisholm in politics. She began spending some of her time in Buffalo, which brought some political criticism that she was being inattentive to her district.

By the mid- to late-1970s, there was growing dissatisfaction with Chisholm among some liberals in New York state and city politics, who felt that Chisholm too often sided with Democratic party bosses over liberal, black or feminist challengers. Instances of her doing this included supporting the incumbent conservative Democrat John J. Rooney over the liberal antiwar activist Allard Lowenstein in a 1972 congressional primary; failing to support Bella Abzug's primary campaigns for U.S. senator in 1976 and New York mayor in 1977; failing to support the young feminist Elizabeth Holtzman's successful primary challenge to the aging congressional incumbent Emanuel Celler in 1972; and remaining neutral during longtime African-American civil rights leader and elected official Percy Sutton's bid in the 1977 mayoral primary, followed by endorsing Ed Koch in a runoff. This dissatisfaction was exemplified by a long 1978 piece published in The Village Voice, titled "Chisholm's Compromises: Politics and the Art of Self-Interest" and written by former UDC ally Andrew W. Cooper and Voice investigative reporter Wayne Barrett. Similarly, The Amsterdam News ran an editorial about the "Chisholm problem". Chisholm defended herself by saying that she was selecting those candidates who could best protect the interests of, and produce government benefits for, her constituents, but critics said that her behavior put the lie to the "unbossed" part of her slogan. To her biographer Barbara Winslow, Chisholm, being black and a woman, had no natural political base, and she was likely siding with the Democratic machine in order to give herself a secure spot from which to speak out on the provocative progressive messages that she wanted to put forth. A later analysis in The Washington Post framed the matter by saying that, despite the celebrity stemming from her presidential campaign, "Chisholm has been a lonely politician. Her unpredictability has led to an isolation that has been augmented by her pride and paranoia."

Hardwick was badly injured in an April 1979 automobile accident. Desiring to take care of her husband, and also dissatisfied with the course of liberal politics in the wake of the Reagan Revolution, Chisholm decided to leave Congress. The possibility that she would be challenged in a Democratic primary election may have also been a factor in her decision. She announced her retirement in February 1982, saying that she looked forward to "a more private life". She further expressed that the Reagan administration was "not responsive to our constituency. The constituency is going to be more voluble and demanding, and I find myself in a position where I can't help them." She also lamented the tactics of the Christian right, which she said made potent use of the media and the symbols of family, morality and the national flag to quiet dissatisfaction in the people. But, overall, Chisholm felt that press reports had overemphasized her political dissatisfaction in her retirement calculus; fundamentally, she said in September 1982, "I've been so obsessed with politics and the desire to help my people all these years, I've never had time to think about my personal life. I think the accident was an instrument, God's way of making me reassess my life." She said she never intended to spend her whole career in politics and looked forward to a return to teaching.

== Later life and death ==
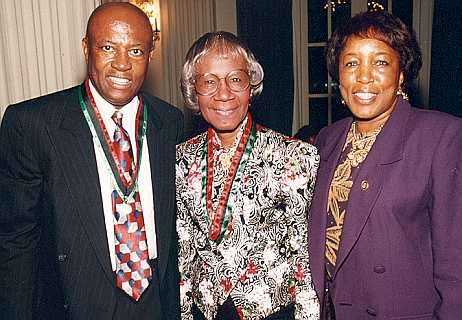
Shirley Chisholm (center) with Representative Edolphus Towns (left) and his wife, Gwen Towns (right)

External videos
- Shirley Chisholm Memorial Service, Congressional Black Caucus, February 15, 2005, C-SPAN

After leaving Congress in January 1983, Chisholm made her home in Williamsville, New York, a suburb of Buffalo. Wanting to resume her career in education, she had hoped to be named a college president, in particular of Medgar Evers College in Brooklyn or of City College of New York in Manhattan, but past political opponents were influential in the selection processes and she received neither post. Similarly, a move to make her New York City Schools Chancellor was blocked by teachers-union head, and longtime foe, Albert Shanker, and she withdrew from consideration for that position.

However, she was offered a dozen possible teaching positions at colleges. She accepted being named to the Purington Chair at the all-women Mount Holyoke College in Massachusetts, a position that she held for the next four years. She was not a member of any particular department, but was able to teach classes in a variety of areas; those previously holding the professorship included W. H. Auden, Bertrand Russell and Arna Bontemps. When questioned why she would want to teach at an institution with mostly affluent whites as students, she replied that she enjoyed the challenge of exposing them to both her feminist viewpoint and her background and experiences. In addition, during this time, she spent the Spring 1985 semester as a visiting professor at the historically black women's Spelman College in Atlanta. At Spelman, she taught classes titled "Congress, Power and Politics", where she sought to engage students in questions about representative government, and "History of the Black Woman in America".

In 1984, Chisholm and C. Delores Tucker co-founded an organization initially known as the National Black Women's Political Caucus. This was established during the vice presidential campaign of Geraldine Ferraro. African-American women from various political organizations convened to set forth a political agenda emphasizing the needs of women of African descent. Chisholm was chosen as its first chair. Creation of the group represented a split with an earlier organization, the National Black Women's Political Leadership Caucus, which had been co-founded by Tucker in 1971. Following a protest by the earlier group, the new one changed its name to the National Political Congress of Black Women, later simplified to the National Congress of Black Women.

During those years, she continued to give speeches at colleges, by her own count visiting over 150 campuses since becoming nationally known. She told students to avoid polarization and intolerance: "If you don't accept others who are different, it means nothing that you've learned calculus." Continuing to be involved politically, she traveled to visit different minority groups and urge them to become a strong force at the local level. She campaigned for Jesse Jackson during his 1984 and 1988 presidential campaigns. In 1990, Chisholm, along with 15 other black women and men, formed African-American Women for Reproductive Freedom.

Her husband, Arthur Hardwick, died in August 1986. Chisholm moved to Florida in 1991. In 1993, President Bill Clinton nominated her to be United States Ambassador to Jamaica, but she could not serve due to poor health, and the nomination was withdrawn. In that same year, she was inducted into the National Women's Hall of Fame.

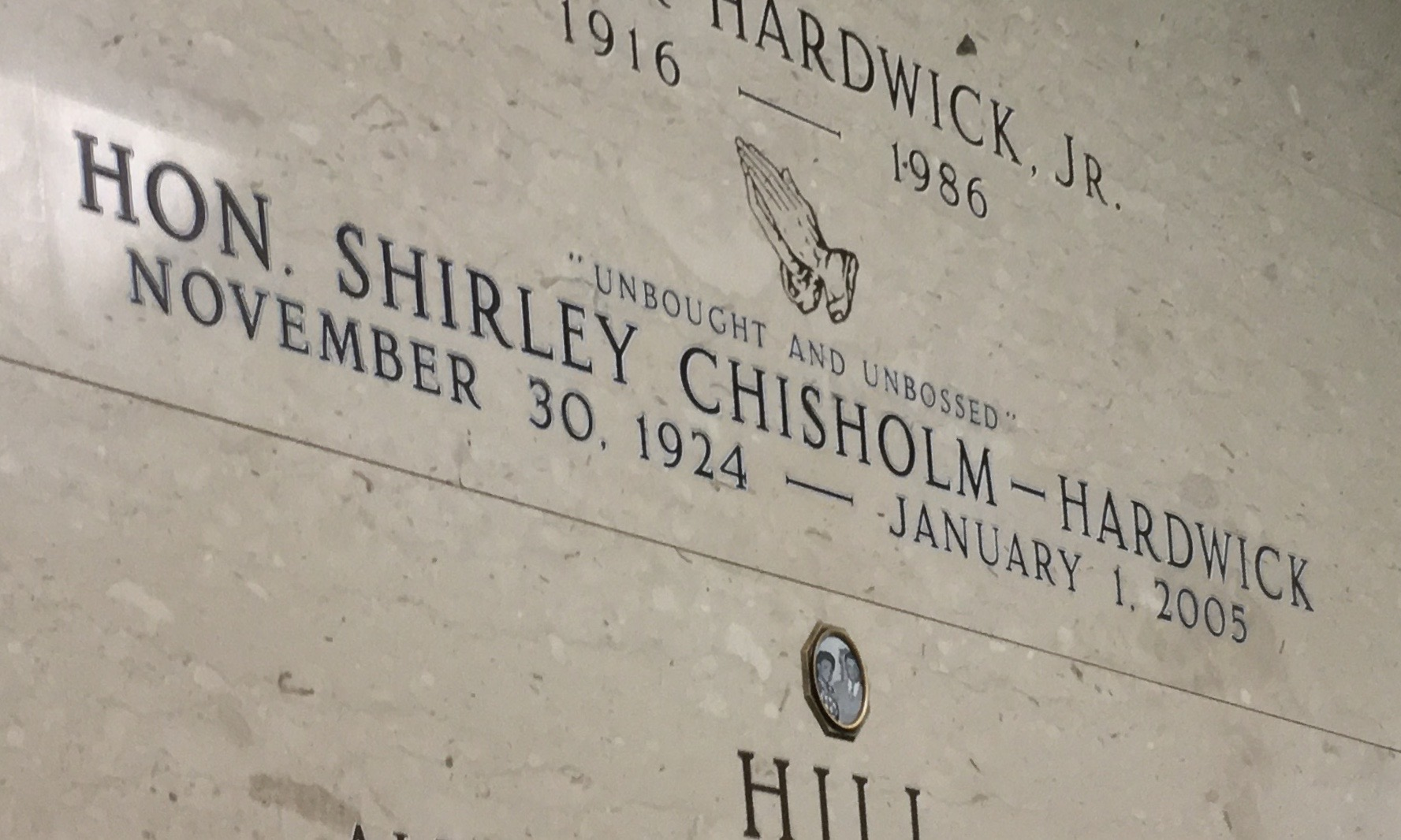
The inscription on Chisholm's mausoleum, including her campaign slogan, "Unbought and Unbossed"

Chisholm died on January 1, 2005, at her home in Ormond Beach, Florida; her health had been in decline after she had suffered a series of small strokes the previous summer. At her funeral, held in Palm Coast, Florida, the minister said that Chisholm had brought about change because "she showed up, she stood up and she spoke up." She is buried in the Birchwood Mausoleum at Forest Lawn Cemetery in Buffalo, where the legend inscribed on her vault reads: "Unbought and Unbossed".

== Legacy ==
In February 2005, Shirley Chisholm '72: Unbought and Unbossed, a documentary film, aired on U.S. public television. It chronicled Chisholm's 1972 bid for the Democratic presidential nomination. It was directed and produced by independent African-American filmmaker Shola Lynch. The film was featured at the Sundance Film Festival in 2004. On April 9, 2006, the film was announced as a winner of a Peabody Award.

In 2014, the first biography of Chisholm for an adult audience was published, Shirley Chisholm: Catalyst for Change, by Brooklyn College history professor Barbara Winslow, who was also the founder and first director of the Shirley Chisholm Project. Until then, only several juvenile biographies had appeared.

=== Monuments ===
The Shirley Chisholm Project on Brooklyn Women's Activism (formerly known as the Shirley Chisholm Center for Research) exists at Brooklyn College to promote research projects and programs on women and to preserve Chisholm's legacy. The Chisholm Project also houses an archive as part of the Chisholm Papers in the college library Special Collections.

In January 2018, Governor Andrew Cuomo announced his intent to build the Shirley Chisholm State Park, a 407-acre (165 ha) state park along 3.5 miles (5.6 km) of the Jamaica Bay coastline, adjoining the Pennsylvania Avenue and Fountain Avenue landfills south of Spring Creek Park's Gateway Center section. The state park was dedicated to Chisholm that September. The park opened to the public on July 2, 2019.

In April 2023, the Vauxhall Primary School in Christ Church, Barbados, which was built in 1976 to replace the school where Chisholm received her elementary education, was renamed the Shirley Chisholm Primary School. The renaming ceremony was attended by Chisholm's relatives, and a plaque was unveiled by Barbados Prime Minister Mia Mottley, the island's first female premier. The school's Shirley Chisholm Memorial Garden contains a bust of Chisholm and a colorful mural showcasing her achievements.

A memorial monument of Chisholm is planned for the entrance to Prospect Park in Brooklyn by Parkside Avenue station, designed by artists Amanda Williams and Olalekan Jeyifous. After four years of delays and revisions, the project gained approval from the New York City Public Design Commission during 2023.

Shirley Chisholm Cultural Institute

Founded in 1977 by Congresswoman Shirley Chisholm and her colleagues, the Shirley Chisholm Cultural Institute (SCCI) exists to "preserve the legacy of Congresswoman Shirley Chisholm through the initiatives cultivated during her public service career with 21st century activism and innovation," according to the institute's website. Chisholm started the Institute as a Nonprofit for children, and was originally named "Shirley Chisholm Cultural Institute for Children," to provide education and support for youths.

Barbara Bullard is the current president of the Institute and the only CEO in its history. The Institute furthers Chisholm's legacy through national initiatives, including contributions to the Congressional Caucus for Black Women and Girls' "Extended Black Women Best Policy Framework," co-sponsorship of H.R. 1088—the Shirley Chisholm Congressional Gold Medal Initiative—and organizing the historic visit of the Congressional Black Caucus to Brooklyn, New York.

=== The Shirley Chisholm Legacy Project ===
The Shirley Chisholm Legacy Project, founded by Jacqueline Patterson, aims to advance climate justice for black communities through the Just Transition Framework. This initiative links frontline black leaders, especially women, with the necessary resources to drive systemic change from harmful extractive practices to an economy that acknowledges the principles of sustainable living. The project aims to address the interconnected challenges of environmental issues, poverty, racial discrimination and gender inequality.

=== Political ===
Chisholm's legacy came into renewed prominence during the 2008 Democratic presidential primaries, when Barack Obama and Hillary Clinton staged their historic "firsts" battle – where the victor would be either the first major-party African-American nominee, or the first female nominee – with at least one observer crediting Chisholm's 1972 campaign as having paved the way for both of them.

Chisholm has been a major influence on other women of color in politics, among them California Congresswoman Barbara Lee, who stated in a 2017 interview that Chisholm had a profound impact on her career. Lee had worked for Chisholm's 1972 presidential campaign. Former Ohio state senator and president of Our Revolution Nina Turner has also described herself as a "Shirley Chisholm Democrat" and invoked her "unbought and unbossed" slogan, stating that the latter phrase "speaks to my soul every day".

By the time of the 50th anniversary of Chisholm entering Congress, The New York Times was headlining "2019 Belongs to Shirley Chisholm", saying that "Chisholm was a one-woman precursor to modern progressive politics" and that she was "enjoying a resurgence of interest 14 years after her death".

Chisholm has also inspired Vice President Kamala Harris, who recognized Chisholm's presidential campaign by using similar typography and red-and-yellow color scheme in her own 2020 presidential campaign's promotional materials and logo. Harris launched her presidential campaign 47 years to the day after Chisholm's presidential campaign.

=== In popular culture ===
Actress Uzo Aduba portrayed Chisholm in the FX on Hulu miniseries Mrs. America, released in April 2020, for which she won an Emmy Award for Outstanding Supporting Actress in a Limited Series.

In November 2020, Danai Gurira was cast as Shirley Chisholm in The Fighting Shirley Chisholm, directed by Cherien Dabis, about her 1972 run for president. However, as of 2024, the film had not appeared, and it was still considered to be in development.

Another film, Shirley, was announced in February 2021, with Regina King as Chisholm and John Ridley directing. Also announced in the cast were Lance Reddick, Lucas Hedges, Amirah Vahn, André Holland, Christina Jackson, Michael Cherrie, Dorian Missick, W. Earl Brown and Terrence Howard. Shirley was released on Netflix in March 2024.

Chisholm was also heavily featured in Mel Brooks's 2023 satirical television series History of the World, Part II, played by Wanda Sykes. Segments throughout the series loosely detailed Chisholm's presidential bid stylized as episodes of Shirley!, a fictional 1970s sitcom. The episodes "starred" other members of Chisholm's family and friends, including Conrad Chisholm (Colton Dunn), Florynce Kennedy (Kym Whitley) and Ruby Seale (Marla Gibbs).

The rapper Biz Markie mentioned Chisholm in his popular 1988 song Nobody Beats the Biz. The lyrics: "Reagan is the Pres, but I voted for Shirley Chisholm", introduced many young listeners to Shirley Chisholm. The six minute overture But I Voted for Shirley Chisholm by David Hearne was commissioned by the Brooklyn Philharmonic in 2012. It integrates samples from Biz Markie's song "Nobody beats the biz" which include the following lyrics: "Make you co-operate with the rhythm / that is what I give 'em / Reagan is the Prez' but I voted for Shirley Chisholm." Additional artists have used this lyric, including Redman and Method Man in 1999 ("Clinton is the president, I still voted for Shirley Chisholm") and LL Cool J in 2006 ("George Bush is the Prez, but I voted for Shirley Chisholm"). Chisholm is mentioned in Spread by Outkast ("You're the prism, Shirley Chisholm/Was the first").

== Honors and awards ==
=== American honors ===
- Congressional Gold Medal (posthumously awarded) by the Shirley Chisholm Congressional Gold Medal Act, signed by President Joe Biden – December 2024.
- Presidential Medal of Freedom (posthumously awarded) by President Barack Obama at a ceremony in the White House. – November 2015.
- William L. Dawson Award by the Congressional Black Caucus Foundation– 1982.

=== Honorary degrees ===
- In 1974, Chisholm was awarded an Honorary Doctor of Laws degree by Aquinas College and was their commencement speaker.
- In 1975, Chisholm was awarded an Honorary Doctor of Laws degree by Smith College.
- In 1981, Chisholm was awarded an Honorary Doctor of Laws degree by Mount Holyoke College.
- In 1996, Chisholm was awarded an Honorary Doctor of Laws Degree by Stetson University, in Deland, Florida.

=== Other recognition ===
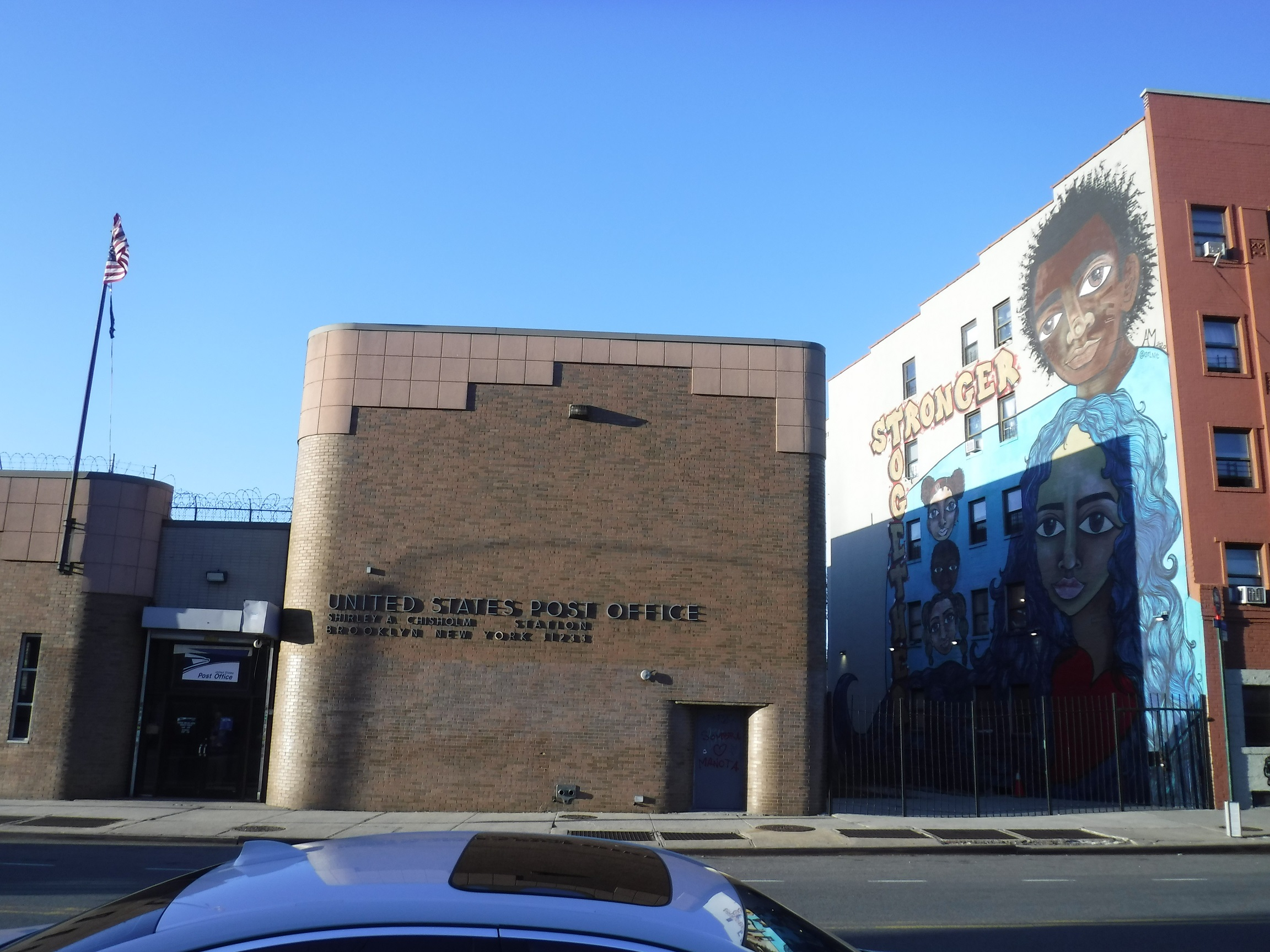
USPS Shirley A. Chisholm Station at 1915 Fulton Street (2025)

- In 1991, Chisholm was the commencement speaker at East Stroudsburg University in East Stroudsburg, Pennsylvania, where she received the first-ever conferred honorary doctorate from the university. An annual ESU student award was created in her honor.
- In 1993, she was inducted into the National Women's Hall of Fame.
- In 2002, scholar Molefi Kete Asante included Shirley Chisholm on his list of 100 Greatest African Americans.
- The Stuyvesant U.S. Post Office Station at 1915 Fulton Street was renamed "Shirley A. Chisholm Station" on August 2, 2005, after the renaming legislation passed the U.S. House and Senate earlier that year.
- On January 31, 2014, the Shirley Chisholm Forever Stamp was issued. It is the 37th stamp in the Black Heritage series of U.S. stamps.
- The Shirley Chisholm Living-Learning Community at Mount Holyoke College in South Hadley, Massachusetts is a residential hall floor in which students of African descent can choose to live.

== Books ==
=== Books by Chisholm ===
- Chisholm, Shirley (1970). Unbought and Unbossed. Houghton Mifflin. ISBN 978-0-395-10932-8
- Chisholm, Shirley (2010). Scott Simpson (ed.). Unbought and Unbossed: Expanded 40th Anniversary Edition. Take Root Media. ISBN 978-0-9800590-2-1
- Chisholm, Shirley (1973). The Good Fight. Harper Collins. ISBN 978-0-06-010764-2
- Chisholm, Shirley, Zinga A. Fraser (Editor) (2024) Shirley Chisholm in Her Own Words: Speeches and Writings, University of California Press, ISBN 978-0520386983

=== Books for children ===
- Williams, Alicia D. Illustrated by Harrison, April (2021) Shirley Chisholm Dared: The Story of the First Black Woman in Congress, Penguin Random House, ISBN 9780593123683
- Brownmiller, Susan.(1971) Shirley Chisholm: A Biography. Doubleday. ISBN 978-0385023092
- Starks, Glenn L., Brooks, F. Erik (2024) A Seat at the Table: The Life and Times of Shirley Chisholm, Lawrence Hill Books, ISBN 9781641609265
- Hicks, Nancy.(1971) The Honorable Shirley Chisholm, Congresswoman from Brooklyn., Lion Books, LCCN 78-127394

=== Books for adults ===
- Winslow, Barbara (2014) Shirley Chisholm : Catalyst for Change, 1926-2005. Westview Press, a member of the Perseus Books Group. ISBN 9780813347691
- Curwood, Anastasia (2023) Shirley Chisholm: Champion of Black Feminist Power Politics, University of North Carolina Press, ISBN 978-1469671178

== See also ==
- African-American candidates for President of the United States
- List of African-American United States representatives
- Politics of New York City
- United States House of Representatives
- Women in the United States House of Representatives

== General and cited references ==
- Brooks-Bertram, Peggy; Nevergold, Barbara A. Seals (2009). Uncrowned Queens, Volume 3: African American Women Community Builders of Western New York. In Commemoration of the Centennial of the Niagara Movement. Buffalo, New York: Uncrowned Queens Institute-SUNY Press. ISBN 978-0-9722977-2-1.
- Curwood, Anastasia C. (2023). Shirley Chisholm: Champion of Black Feminist Power Politics. The University of North Carolina Press. doi:10.1353/book.109689. ISBN 978-1-4696-7119-2. S2CID 259517966.
- Winslow, Barbara (2014). Shirley Chisholm: Catalyst for Change, 1926–2005. Lives of American Women (1st ed.). Boulder, CO: Westview Press. ISBN 978-0-8133-4769-1. OCLC 847126335.

Attribution

New York State Assembly
Preceded by Thomas Jones	Member of the New York Assembly from King's 17th district 1965	Constituency abolished
New constituency	Member of the New York Assembly from the 45th district 1966	Succeeded by Max Turshen
Preceded by Herbert Marker	Member of the New York Assembly from the 55th district 1967–1968	Succeeded by Thomas Fortune
U.S. House of Representatives
Preceded by Edna Kelly	Member of the U.S. House of Representatives from New York's 12th congressional district 1969–1983	Succeeded by Major Owens
Party political offices
Preceded by Patsy Mink	Secretary of the House Democratic Caucus; 1977–1981	Succeeded by Geraldine Ferraro
