= J. Yolande Daniels =

American architect, designer and educator

- Born: 1962 (age 63–64)
- Education: City College of New York and Columbia University
- Occupation: Architect
- Awards: Rome Prize
- Buildings: Museum of Contemporary African Diasporan Arts

J. Yolande Daniels (born 1962) is an American architect, designer and educator. She is a founding principal of studioSUMO, an architecture firm that speaks to socio-cultural landscapes through design.

== Education ==
Daniels received her B. Arch from City College of New York and her M. Arch from the Graduate School of Architecture, Planning and Preservation at Columbia University. After completing her graduate studies, Daniels received two fellowships from the Whitney Museum of American Art’s Independent Study Program in 1996.

== Career ==
Daniels came to find her voice as a black woman, the figure she often found “objectified or negated in the approach to architecture.” The highlights of her earlier works and personal research focus on the critiques on the techniques of power – gender, sexuality and race and how these social structures shape the built environment in the form of architecture.

While at the Whitney Independent Study Program, Daniels developed her practice that responds to issues of gender, race and other forms of subjugation in the built environment through research and design. Daniels co-founded studioSUMO with Sunil Bald in 1997. With Bald as studioSUMO, Daniels has designed projects such as the Museum of Contemporary African Diasporan Art in Fort Greene, Brooklyn, New York in 2007 and the Mizuta Museum at Josai University in Sakado, Japan in 2012. As of 2021, studioSUMO has established offices in both New York and Los Angeles. She has taught at the University of Michigan, Massachusetts Institute of Technology and Columbia University, where she remained for a decade. Currently, she is an assistant professor at the University of Southern California where she teaches architectural design.

In 1996, Daniels devised a standing urinal for women first installed in a guestroom of New York City's Gramercy Park Hotel, to challenge architecture, at the scale of space and object, to confront gender and sexuality as a biased technology in building and clothing codes. The straddle-style installation, FEMMEpissoire, consists of pipes for flush, a pair of rubber pants, a dryer addressing the commodification of female hygiene, and a mounted mirror for self-reflection of users’ bodies and identities. The charge of “politics of standing” queries “whether the act of controlling the flow of urine constitutes an essential personal freedom for men." The work is also viewed as an echo to gay men's reclamation of pissoire and public restroom in the 1990s from the historical felony against homosexual acts. This design was the first that could "allow its user to observe her body evacuating itself of urine."

With Intimate Landscape of the Shotgun House in Dallas, Texas, Daniels continued the dialogue on the materialization of power through the lenses of slavery history. In search for terms of domesticity in the Shotgun House, a vernacular typology in the US South to house enslaved people from West-Africa, she reprised the history of surrounding landscape through quotes from WPA slave narratives. The texts were projected on the interior walls, utilizing the power of lights and shadows, and gave agency to “the desire of the (plantation) landscape” to keep people together and apart at the same time. Some earlier projects Daniels worked at studioSUMO brought racial issues to the forefront in similar fashion.

In her endeavors, Daniel confronted architecture to the heaviness of black history in scales ranging from territorial mapping to small-scale installations to publication and writings. De Facto/de Jure: by Custom/by Law, for example, researched and analyzed the legal cartography of exclusion and inclusion during the 20th century's Great Migration along the Southern Crescent Railway Line. For the reception area at The Museum of Contemporary African Diasporan Arts (MoCADA) in Brooklyn, Daniels devised a three-dimensionalized map tracing the migration of African diaspora. Her published essays on “advocacy architecture”, which dealt with the spatial politics of gender, race and class, included Crime and Ornament (YYZ Press, 2002), White Papers, Black Marks (Athlone Press, 2000), Black bodies, black space: A-waiting spectacle (2000) and Grey Areas (Chalkham Hill Press, 1999).

Before joining the University of Southern California as assistant professor in 2019, she has lectured at MIT and Yale University as visiting professor, focusing on studies of thresholds across cultural differences, and taught architecture at Columbia University, City College of New York, the University of Michigan. She also held the Silcott Chair at Howard University and was the Interim Director of the M.Arch program at Parsons School of Constructed Environments.

Daniels, as a member of the Black Reconstruction Collective, had her work black city: The Los Angeles Edition, commissioned for the Reconstructions: Architecture and Blackness in America by the Museum of Modern Art.

== Projects ==
- FEMMEpissoire (installation), Gramercy Park Hotel, New York City (1996)
- Intimate Landscape of the Shotgun House, Dallas, Texas (2000)
- Museum of African Art (interior space), Long Island City (2001)
- Museum of African Diaspora Art, Brooklyn (2006)
- Josai University School of Business Management, Sakado, Japan (2006)
- Mitan Housing, Miami (2007)
- Leaney Harlem Duplex, Harlem (2009)
- Mizuta Museum of Art, Sakado, Japan (2012)
- iHouse Dormitory, JIU University, Togane, Japan (2016)
- black city: The Los Angeles Edition, MoMA, (2021)

== Publications ==
O: the apparatus in Crime and Ornament (YYZ Press, 2002)

Essay in White Papers, Black Marks (Athlone Press, 2000)

Essay in Grey Areas (Chalkham Hill Press, 1999)

== Awards and honors ==
- The American Academy of Arts and Letters Architecture Award, 2015
- Emerging Voices Award, 2010
- Design Vanguard Award, 2006-2007
- MacDowell Colony Fellowship, 2005–2006.
- Rome Prize in Architecture, 2003-2004
- Helena Rubinstein Critical Studies Fellow at the Whitney American Museum of Art, 1996-1998
