= Foster Site =

Archaeological site in Virginia, United States

- The Foster Site
- U.S. National Register of Historic Places
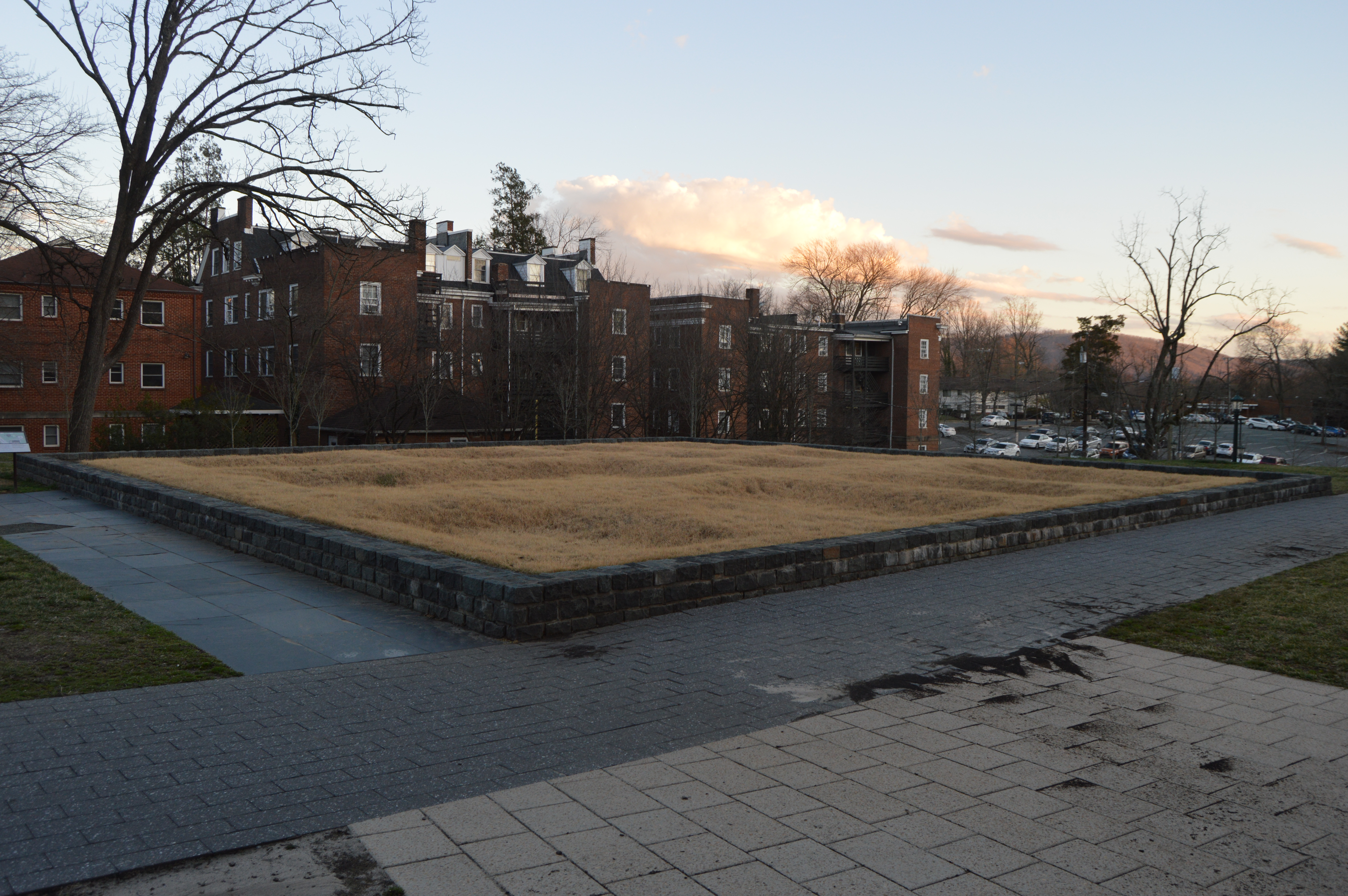

- Location within Virginia Location within the United States
- Location: 1540 Jefferson Park Ave., Charlottesville, Virginia
- Coordinates: 38°1′54″N 78°30′16″W
- Area: Less than 1 acre (0.40 ha)
- NRHP reference No.: 16000259
- Added to NRHP: May 16, 2016

The Foster Site is a historic archaeological site on the campus of the University of Virginia in Charlottesville, Virginia. The site was the location in the 19th century of a homestead purchased by a free African-American woman, Catherine "Kitty" Foster. The site includes archaeological and foundational remnants of her house, an outbuilding (likely a smokehouse), a brick-lined well, and a family cemetery. Foster purchased a parcel of over 2 acres (0.81 ha) in 1833, that had originally been developed for African Americans working on the construction of the university.

The site was listed on the National Register of Historic Places in 2016.

== See also ==
- National Register of Historic Places listings in Charlottesville, Virginia
