= Mario Gooden =

Architect from the United States (1965-)

- Born: 1965 (age 60–61)
- Education: Columbia University Graduate School of Architecture, Planning and Preservation
- Occupation: architect
- Practice: Mario Gooden Studio; Huff + Gooden Architects
- Projects: California African American Museum

Mario Gooden (born 1965) is an architect in the United States. He is the director at Mario Gooden Studio based in New York, New York. He was previously the principal of Huff + Gooden Architects which he co-founded with Ray Huff in 1997. Gooden is also a professor of Practice and Director of the Master of Architecture program at the Graduate School of Architecture, Planning and Preservation (GSAPP) of Columbia University, where he teaches architectural design and theory. Gooden held previous academic appointments at the Yale School of Architecture as the Louis I. Khan Distinguished Visiting professor, the Southern California Institute of Architecture (Sci-Arc) in Los Angeles, the University of Arizona (Tucson), the University of Florida (Gainesville), Clemson University, and The City College of New York.

== Biography ==
In 1987 Gooden received his Bachelor of Science in design from Clemson University, (Magna cum laude). In 1990 he received a Master of Architecture degree from the Columbia University Graduate School of Architecture, Planning and Preservation, New York, and was the recipient of the Charles McKim Prize for Excellence in Design.

Gooden's firm's work has been featured in journals and publications including Architecture Magazine, Architectural Record Magazine, Metropolis, The New York Times, Architecture & Urbanism (A+U) and ARTFORUM International Magazine. Huff + Gooden Architects work has been exhibited at the 11th Venice Biennale in 2006, the Netherlands Architecture Institute (NAi), the National Building Museum in Washington, DC, and the Municipal Arts Society in New York. Gooden previously worked in the offices of Zaha Hadid in London and Steven Holl in New York.

Gooden's work, writings, and lectures have discussed architecture and the translation of cultural landscapes defined by the parameters of race, class, gender, and technology. His urban and cultural theory research was published at the Dubai Initiative's Urbanism in the Middle East: A Search for New Paradigms in 2011 and Layered Urbanisms (Yale University, 2008). He edited Global Topologies: Converging Territories (Columbia University, 2013).

== Architectural work ==
Visual and performance / performing art are particular lenses through which Gooden seeks new pedagogical strategies between art, architecture, and culture in order to articulate new sites of meanings in his practice.

In 2011, Huff + Gooden Architects, was selected to design the $67 million renovation and expansion to the California African American Museum located in Exposition Park in Los Angeles, California. The design is a cultural critique of the current museum's physical and cultural context and the expanded museum's social visibility.

In 2005, Gooden and Huff curated and designed the installation, entitled Un/Spoken Spaces: Inside and Outside the Boundaries of Class Race and Space at the Gibbes Museum of Art in Clemson, South Carolina. The exhibition was curated from works in the museum's permanent collection, which consists primarily of 19th-century portraiture and southern plantation scenes to reveal how the collection and architecture have been used to spatialize and reinforce issues of class and race.

Huff + Gooden's 2005 international competition winning design for the Virginia Key Beach Park Museum in Miami, Florida is included in the American architectural history textbook, USA: Modern Architectures in History (Reaktion Books, 2008) by Gwendolyn Wright. In chapter seven, "Disjunctures and Alternatives, 1985 to the Present" Wright states:

"Significant architecture helps us confront contentious topics. Huff + Gooden, an African-American firm based in Charleston, South Carolina, have designed a small museum for the Virginia Key Beach Park (2005–8) that underscores the ambiguities of racial pride and segregation…. The structure and the larger landscape by Walter Hood continue the theme of multiplicities and changes over time. This new sensibility in American modern architecture encourages visitors to contemplate multiple dimensions of the past and the future, buildings and their surroundings."

In 2021, his work as part of the Black Reconstruction Collective (BRC) was featured in the Museum of Modern Art exhibition Reconstructions: Architecture and Blackness in America.

== Writing ==
Gooden's book Dark Space: Architecture, Representation, Black Identity was published by Columbia University Press in 2016. The book offers a subtle reading of African American cultural institutions and calls for "more critical design and discourse." In one of the book's essays,"The Problem with African American Museums," republished in The Avery Review, the author argues against "Superficialities and generalizations regarding cultural identity" in museum architecture. In 2012, Gooden was awarded a MacDowell Colony residency and a National Endowment for the Arts Fellowship. His article "_ORM is a Four-Letter Word…" which examines avant-gardist's art practices and the relationships to architectural production and the de-emphasis of form, is published in Perspecta No. 43.

== Buildings and projects ==
- Market Up Mixed Use Development, Maboneng District, Johannesburg, South Africa (2014–2016).
- California African American Museum, Los Angeles.
- Gerald R. Ford Federal Building, Grand Rapids, Michigan (2012).
- Virginia Key Beach Park Museum, Miami, Florida (2009).
- Memminger Theatre, Spoleto Festival USA, Charleston, South Carolina (2008).
- Malcom C. Hursey Elementary School, North Charleston, South Carolina (2004).
- Mary Ford Elementary School, North Charleston, South Carolina (2003).
- Herbert Hassell Aquatic Facility, Charleston, South Carolina (2002).
- Visual & Performing Arts Library for the Brooklyn Public Library, Brooklyn New York (2002).

== Bibliography ==
1. Dark Space: Architecture, Representation, Black Identity. New York: Columbia Books on Architecture and the city, Columbia University Press, 2016. ISBN 9781941332139
2. Global Topologies: Converging Territories. New York: GSAPP Books, Columbia University, 2012. ISBN 9781883584726
3. “_ORM is a Four-Letter Word…That Starts with F.” Perspecta No. 43. The Yale Architecture Journal. December 2010.
4. Layered Urbanisms. Nina Rappaport, (Editor). New Haven: Yale School of Architecture. 2008.
5. “The Dresser Trunk Project.” Lunch: Territory. Vol. 3. (2008): 148–153.
6. "Disjunctures and Alternatives", USA: Modern Architecture in History, Gwendolyn Wright. New York:Reaktion Books, 2008.
7. “A Newer Orleans: Six Proposals.” Artforum. (March 2006): 274–275.
8. “Built in Context.” Metropolis Magazine. (May 2006): 142- 145.
9. A Break with Tradition: Gibbes Museum of Art celebrates centennial with provocative exhibit.” By Jack MacCray. Post & Courier. (January 20, 2005).
10. “Art Deconstructed. Art + Architecture: Two Architects turn the century old Gibbes on its head.” By Brent Landford. Charleston City Paper. (February 2, 2005).
11. “Interview: Huff + Gooden Ray Huff and Mario Gooden.” South. Vol. 1. (2005): 40–47.
12. “ArchiSpeak. Tom Porter (Editor). London: Spon Press. 2004.
13. “For African-Americans, a Chance to Draft History.” New York Times. (August 24, 2004).
14. 25 Houses Under 2,500 Square Feet. James Truelove (Editor). New York: Harper Design International. 2003.
15. “A House for a Future President.” Blueprints. National Building Museum. (Summer 2003): 8–9.
16. “On the Boards … A House for a Future President,” Architecture Magazine. (November 2003): 35.
17. “A Visual Arts Library That’s Out of the Box,” New York Times. (May 15, 2002)
18. “Beach Residence” A+U: Architecture and Urbanism, (June 2002): 66–69
19. “20 Years of Emerging Voices.” Metropolis Magazine. (March 2001): 190.
20. “Boite Americaine - En Visite, Maisons d’ici et d’ailleurs,” Cree Architecture Interiors, (2001): 56.
21. “Huff + Gooden Shapes a Socially Vital Modernism in Traditional South Carolina.” Architectural Record. (February 2001): 89–90; 108–111.
22. “Mediated Spaces and the (Re)Positing of Architecture. ACSA West Regional Conference, 1997.
23. “Subject Object Text,” 13th National Conference on the Beginning Design Student, 1996.
24. “Strategic Map-Making: Mapping and Culture” Proceedings: ACSA Southeast-Southwest Regional Conference, 1995.
25. “Military Base Conversions: Washington Navy Yard.” Architecture. The AIA Journal. August 1994.
26. “Odysseus, Existence, Tectonic.” (In)Quest. Charleston: Clemson University. 1992.
27. “Precise Mis-reading.” Newsline. Columbia University Graduate School of Architecture Planning and Preservation. New York: Columbia University. 1990
