= Amanda Williams (artist) =

American artist and architect (born 1974)

- Born: 1974 (age 51–52); Evanston, IL
- Website: awstudioart.com

Amanda Williams (born 1974) is a visual artist based in Bridgeport, Chicago. Williams grew up in Chicago's South Side and trained as an architect. Her work investigates color, race, and space while blurring the conventional line between art and architecture. She has taught at the California College of the Arts in San Francisco, Sam Fox School of Design & Visual Arts at Washington University in St. Louis, Illinois Institute of Technology, and her alma mater Cornell University. Williams has lectured at the Metropolitan Museum of Art, New Museum, School of the Art Institute of Chicago, and at a TED conference.

== Early life and education ==
Williams was born in Evanston, Illinois and grew up in the Auburn-Gresham neighborhood in the South Side of Chicago, attending the University of Chicago Laboratory Schools for high school. She received her Bachelor of Architecture from Cornell University in 1997, where she was a member of the Quill and Dagger society, and worked for a commercial architecture firm in San Francisco for six years before returning to Chicago to pursue art full-time.

== Career and Important Works ==
William's work deals with the intersection of race, urban space, and color and is heavily influenced by her background as an architect. While enrolled at Center Program in Chicago, Williams felt unsatisfied with paint on canvas, and was challenged by visiting critic Tricia van Eck to enlarge the scale of her work to match her architecture.

In addition to large works, Williams has installed an exhibition at the Storefront for Art and Architecture in New York. The work titled What Black is This, You Say? is a response to the movement for black lives spurred by the murder of George Floyd.

=== Color(ed) Theory ===
Her most famous project, Color(ed) Theory, which debuted at the Chicago Architecture Biennial in 2015, was met with critical acclaim for its confrontational look at race and space in the South Side of Chicago. Between 2014 and 2016, Williams repainted eight vacated and condemned houses in the Englewood neighborhood with the help of friends and family members. The artist chose eight colors she felt best represented black consumer culture specific to the South Side of Chicago, including Harold's Chicken Shack red, Newport 100's teal, Crown Royal Bag purple, Flamin’ Hot Cheetos orange, Ultrasheen conditioner blue, Pink Oil moisturizer, Currency Exchange yellow, and Safe Passage yellow. The bright colors converted the desolate, abandoned homes into sculptural objects, drawing attention to the issue of underinvestment in black communities and the corresponding decline of those neighborhoods. The project was displayed as a series of photographs.

=== Uppity Negress ===
Part of The Arts Club of Chicago Garden Projects, Uppity Negress is a site specific, exterior installation. Positioned in the intermediate space between public and private, the installation addresses accessibility and authority in urban space. The piece engages the existing fence with a secondary fence that breaks away and deconstructs itself from the original boundary. Through the process of de-familiarization, Williams begins to question the connotations that fences hold and their dual function as both containers and barriers, particularly, in relation to gender and race. Referencing the contemporary usage of the term "uppity negress", Williams creates a disorienting space with a deformed fence referencing black women's place in the city.

=== Chicago Works: First Solo Exhibition (MCA Chicago) ===
For her first solo-show, which ran in the Museum of Contemporary Art, Chicago, from July 18 to December 31, 2017, the artist presented work responding to changes in contemporary urban spaces. The show featured sculptures and photography that focused on the relationship between context and material value. Williams asked viewers to consider the social, political and racial narratives which contribute to the devaluation of a neighborhood. Although her work focused specifically on neighborhoods on Chicago's South Side, the ideas are applicable to nearly every modern urban landscape.

Williams’ gold brick installations that were featured in the show examined the evolution of urban landscape and questioned the legitimacy of how we assess the value of architecture in declining neighborhoods. With the help of family members and friends, William's painstakingly painted imitation gold-leaf onto locally sourced bricks from the demolished remains of the Color(ed) Theory houses. In It’s a Gold mine/ Is the Gold Mine? a stack of bricks painted gold are displayed on an artist-made pallet. By using bricks from demolished buildings, Williams attaches commercial and conceptual value to salvaged material deemed useless in their previous contexts. Painting them gold and leaving them on display in art museums adds another level of prestige and merit to the objects’ worth, alluding to the historic significance of the "gold standard." William plays with desire and access in She’s Mighty Mighty, Just Letting’ It All Hang Out, where a golden brick wall completely blocks off one of the gallery entrances. There was also a room barred by stacks of gold bricks, inaccessible to viewers aside from a small opening, although William's arranged for residents of Englewood to have exclusive access to it. The gold bricks were an extension of her project Color(ed) Theory, and highlight how demolition and renewal can shape the lives of urban populations, raising difficult questions about social and political undertones in Chicago.

=== Cadastral Shaking ===
For the inauguration of Lori Lightfoot's mayoral office in Chicago, the Smart Museum of Art loaned Cadastral Shaking (Chicago v1), part of a series of screen and relief prints that Williams journalist Natalie Y. Moore based on maps of Chicago created by the Federal Housing Administration that began the practice of redlining.

=== She Built NYC ===
Amanda Williams, with Olalekan Jeyifous, was awarded the commission for the public monument that will honor Shirley Chisholm, slated for Prospect Park, Brooklyn on April 24, 2019.

=== What black is this you say? ===
From November to December 2020, William presented a series of multi-platform, color artwork at the Rhona Hoffman Gallery, in Chicago. This was an informal response to #Blackout Tuesday, a social media movement in protest of the murder of George Floyd. Through this artwork, she wanted to explore the plurality, complexity and nuance of the shade, in relation to the Black experience.

== Selected exhibitions ==
Solo exhibitions:

2017:

- July 18 – Dec 2017 - Chicago Works: Amanda Williams – Museum of Contemporary Art, Chicago, IL
- June 17 – September 23, 2017 – Uppity Negress – The Arts Club of Chicago, Chicago, IL
- Spring – Fall 2017 – A Way, Away (Listen While I Say) - Pulitzer Arts Foundation, St. Louis, MO
- September 1 – January 31, 2018 – Off the Wall – Monique Meloche Gallery, Chicago, IL
- 50x50 City of Chicago Year of Public Art – Department of Cultural Affairs, Chicago, IL

2015:

- of REQUIEMS and RELIQUARIES: work by AMANDA WILLIAMS – Chicago Art Department, Chicago, IL

Group exhibitions:

2019:

- Solidary and Solitary – Smart Museum of Art, Chicago, IL

2018:

- Dimensions of Citizenship – Venice Biennale of Architecture

2016:

- At First I Left Messages In the Street (curated by Allison Glenn), Chicago, IL

2015:

- Colo(red) Theory – Chicago Architecture Biennial, Chicago, IL
- Vacancy... – Glass Curtain Gallery, Columbia College, Chicago, IL

== Recognition/Awards/Fellowships ==
- MacArthur Foundation Grant, 2022
- Leadership Greater Chicago, Fellow, 2018
- United States Artists Fellow for Architecture & Design, 2018
- Designer, member of ensemble representing U.S. in Venice Biennale of Architecture, 2018
- Member, exhibition design team for Obama Presidential Center, 2018
- Painter & Sculptors Grant, Joan Mitchell Foundation, 2017
- Efroysom Family Contemporary Arts Fellow, 2016
- Stan Lipkin & Evelyn Appell Lipkin Award, 3Arts, 2014
