= V. Mitch McEwen =

American architect

- Born: 1978 (age 47–48); Washington, DC
- Education: Harvard College, Columbia University
- Occupation: Architect
- Projects: House Opera : Opera House, Methexis: The Algorithmic Recitative

V. Mitch McEwen (born 1978) is an American architect and urban planner, cultural activist, and assistant professor at the Princeton University School of Architecture. She is co-founder of Atelier Office, a design and cultural practice working within the fields of urbanism, technology, and the arts. McEwen is a co-founder and member of the Black Reconstruction Collective and a board member of the Van Alen Institute in New York. She was given the 2010 New York State Council on the Arts Independent Projects Award for Architecture, Planning and Design.

== Education and career ==
McEwen earned her Master of Architecture degree at Columbia University in New York City and a B.A. in Social Studies from Harvard College in Cambridge, MA.

McEwen was an assistant professor at the University of Michigan's Taubman College of Architecture and Urban Planning from 2014 to 2017; in the fall of 2017, she joined Princeton as an assistant professor in architecture.

In 2014, McEwen received a Graham Foundation research grant for her project House Opera | Opera House, and she was awarded a second Graham Foundation grant in 2016 for Methexis: The Algorithmic Recitative, a collaboration with Farzin Lotfi-Jam which was exhibited at MOCAD in Detroit. McEwen received a 2015 award from the Knight Foundation for her continued work on community housing in Detroit.

In 2016, McEwen's A(n) Office was selected as one of twelve architecture practices included in the United States Pavilion for the 15th Venice Architecture Biennale.

She was named curator of the New Museum's IDEAS city initiative in 2018.

In February 2021, her work was included in the MoMA exhibition Reconstructions: Architecture and Blackness in America, the museum's first architecture exhibition highlighting the synthesis between architecture and African-American cultures and communities. In a New York Times interview with this "new collective of Black architects and artists", fellow exhibition artist Emanuel Admassu said the group is working to "reclaim the larger, civic promise of architecture". McEwen was also interviewed by architectural magazine Dezeen for an article titled Twenty-two women architects and designers you should know.
