= Walter J. Hood =

American designer (b. 1958)

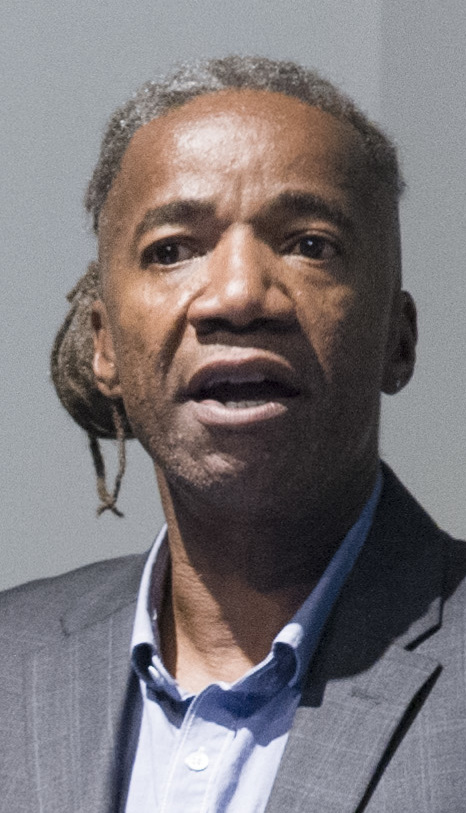
- Hood in 2016
- Born: 1958 (age 67–68); Charlotte, North Carolina, United States
- Education: North Carolina A&T State University (BLA); University of California, Berkeley (MLA; MArch); School of the Art Institute of Chicago (MFA)
- Occupations: Designer, artist, academic administrator, educator, researcher
- Known for: Landscape architecture, installation art
- Awards: American Academy in Rome (2017), MacArthur Fellowship (2019)
- Website: www.hooddesignstudio.com

Walter J. Hood (born 1958) is an American designer, artist, academic administrator, and educator. He is professor of landscape architecture & environmental planning and urban design and chair of the Department of Landscape Architecture & Environmental Planning at the University of California, Berkeley, and principal of Hood Design Studio in Oakland, California. Hood has worked in a variety of settings including architecture, landscape architecture, visual art, community leadership, urban design, and planning and research. He has spent more than 20 years living in Oakland, California. He draws on his strong connection to the Black community in his work and has chosen to work almost exclusively in the public realm and urban environments.

== Early life and education ==
Walter J. Hood was born in 1958 in Charlotte, North Carolina, where he also grew up.

He attended West Charlotte High School, North Carolina A&T State University, receiving a Bachelor of Landscape Architecture in 1981. He received his Master of Architecture and Master of Landscape Architecture from the University of California, Berkeley, in 1989. He also received his Master of Fine Arts from the School of the Art Institute of Chicago in 2013 in studio arts and sculpture, exploring the role of sculpture in urbanism.

== Career ==
Hood established Hood Design Studio in Oakland, California, in 1992. Hood's work spans the range from local, community-based projects—such as Splash Pad Park, a converted traffic island alongside Interstate 580 in Oakland, California—to large-scale garden designs like the grounds for the new M. H. de Young Museum in San Francisco with Swiss architects Herzog & de Meuron (2005). Hood's public spaces embrace the essence of urban environments and their links to urban redevelopment and neighborhood revitalization. He is designing the landscape for the Autry National Center Southwest Museum in Los Angeles, designing an archeological garden within the context of the South Lawn Project at the University of Virginia, and developing a set of monuments and markers for a six-mile waterfront trail in Oakland, California.

Hood's published monographs Urban Diaries (Spacemaker Press, 1997) and Blues & Jazz Landscape Improvisations (Poltroon Press, 1993) illustrate his approach to the design of urban landscapes. These works won an ASLA Research award in 1996. His essay "Macon Memories" is included in Sites of Memory: Perspectives on Architecture and Race (Princeton Architectural Press, 2001).

Hood won an international design competition in 2010 for the Solar Strand project—a quarter-mile solar-panel array on the University at Buffalo's North Campus, financed by the New York Power Authority.

In 2013, Hood served as one of six selection committee members for the Rudy Bruner Award for Urban Excellence.

In 2014, Hood was commissioned by the Metro Nashville Arts Commission to create Witness Walls, a commemorative sculpture celebrating Nashville's civil rights history during the 1950s and 1960s. A public dedication event for the project, Nashville's first civil-rights inspired public art, was held April 21, 2017.

== Awards and recognition ==
In 1997, Hood was a fellow at the American Academy in Rome in Landscape Architecture. His work was featured in the 2006 exhibit "The Good Life: New Public Spaces for Recreation", at the Van Alen Institute in New York. Hood was the 2009 recipient of the prestigious Cooper–Hewitt National Design Award for Landscape Design, and has exhibited and lectured on his professional projects and theoretical works nationally and abroad.

In 2018, The USC School of Architecture's American Academy in China (AAC) selected Hood as that year's research fellow. Hood is to design an installation to be executed using only local artisans and materials in Shanghai and Los Angeles; he will also give lectures in both cities.

== Projects ==
- Migrations, San Diego, CA, 2025
- McColl Park + The Nest, Charlotte, NC, 2025
- Panorama Park, San Francisco, CA, 2025
- Intuit Dome, Inglewood, CA, 2025
- Lift Ev'ry Voice and Sing Park, Jacksonville, FL, 2024
- NVIDIA Campus Park, Santa Clara, CA, 2022
- EPACenter Arts site design, East Palo Alto, California, 2019–ongoing
- Witness Walls, public art installation, Nashville, Tennessee, 2017
- International African American Museum Landscape Design, Charleston, South Carolina, 2013–2023
- Foster Homestead and Burial Ground, South Lawn, University of Virginia, Charlottesville, Virginia, 2008
- Coleman Avenue Gateway, San Jose International Airport, San Jose Public Art Program, San Jose, California, 2007
- West Oakland Historic Train Depot Plaza, Oakland, California, 2008
- Phillip Lifeways Plan, Charleston, South Carolina, Spoleto Art Program, 2006
- Autry National Center Southwest Museum Landscape, Los Angeles, California, 2008
- East Bay Waterfront Trail, Oakland, California, with EDAW and Associates, City of Oakland, Oakland, California, 2002–
- M. H. de Young Museum Landscape Design, Golden Gate Park, San Francisco, California, 2005; with Herzog & de Meuron Architects
- Lion Creek Crossing Park, Oakland, California, EBALC, 2006
- Macon Yards, Poplar Street, City of Macon, Georgia, 2005
- Abraham Lincoln Brigade Memorial, w/ Ann Chamberlain, Embarcadero, San Francisco, California, 2007
- Yerba Buena Lane, San Francisco, California; with the Office of Cheryl Barton, 2005
- Splash Pad Park Renovation and Streetscape Improvement Project, City of Oakland, Oakland, California 2004

== Awards ==
- Thomas Jefferson Foundation Medal in Architecture, 2025
- Vincent Scully Prize, 2024
- Architectural League’s President’s Medal, 2021
- Dorothy and Lillian Gish Award, 2019
- MacArthur Fellowship: MacArthur Foundation, 2019
- American Academy of Arts and Letters: Arts and Letters Award in Architecture, 2017
- University at Buffalo School of Architecture and Planning: Dean's Medal, 2014
- Cooper Hewitt, Smithsonian Design Museum National Design Award for Landscape Design, 2009
- Virginia Key Beach Museum Competition, Miami Fl/1st Prize w/Huff and Gooden Architects 2005/Merit Award, ASLA, Northern Chapter
- Oakland Waterfront 2005/Top Honor Award, Excellence on the Waterfront
- Waterfront Center Award, Oakland Waterfront, October 2004/APWA 2004 Distinguished Project of the Year Award
- Splash Pad Park/Mayor's Proclamation, "Walter Hood Day", Pioneering Achievements in Urban Landscape Design, City of Oakland, April 24, 2004/National Award of Honor American Society of Landscape Architecture, 2003
- Project: Baldwin Hills Master Plan 2001/Best of the Best, California Park and Recreation Society 2002
- Project: Lafayette Square Park/Merit Award, ASLA Southern California Chapter
- Project: Baldwin Hills Master Plan 2001/Place Design Award, EDRA/Places, Third Annual Award 1999
- Project: Lafayette Square Park. Poplar Street Civic Design Competition, First Prize. Macon, Georgia. Jan. 1998
- Rome Prize in Landscape Architecture, The American Academy in Rome, 1996–1997.
- "Urban Diaries" and "Jazz and Blues Landscape Improvisations", American Society of Landscape Architecture National Award of Merit: Research, 1994
- Mount Vernon Riverfront Plan, Community Development Award State of Washington, 1988
- Design Arts Competition, Merit Award, 1988
- University of California Arboretum at Davis/ASLA Certificate For Excellence in the study of Landscape Design, 1987
- Thomas Church Design Award for Excellence in Landscape Design/Department of Landscape Architecture at Berkeley, 1987

== Publications ==
- Hood, Walter (2016). "The Greenprint". In Mostafavi, Mohsen; Doherty, Gareth (eds.). Ecological Urbanism (2nd ed.). Zurich: Lars Müller Publishers. ISBN 978-3-03778-467-9.
- Hood, Walter (2016). "The Consequences of Place". In Ibler, Marianne (ed.). A New Golden Age – Nordic Architecture & Landscape. Aarhus: Archipress M. ISBN 978-8791872129.
- Hood, Walter; Basnak, Megan (2015). "Diverse Truths: Unveiling the Hidden Layers of the Shadow Catcher Commemoration". In Tauke, Beth; Smith, Korydon; Davis, Charles (eds.). Diversity and Design: Understanding Hidden Consequences. New York: Routledge. ISBN 978-1-138-02317-8.
- Hood, Walter (2014). "Objects in the Field, Photovoltaics in the Landscape". In Scognamiglio, Alessandra (ed.). Photovoltaics, Forms, Landscapes : Beauty and Power of Designed Photovoltaics. Florence: ETA. ISBN 978-8889407110.
- Hood, Walter (2012). "Bioline: Activating the Mundane". In Jacob, Mary Jane; Baas, Jacquelynn (eds.). Chicago Makes Modern: How Creative Minds Changed Society. Chicago, IL: University of Chicago Press. ISBN 978-0-226-38956-1.
- Hood, Walter (2010). "Center Street". In Mostafavi, Mohsen; Doherty, Gareth (eds.). Ecological Urbanism. Zurich: Lars Müller Publishers. ISBN 978-3-03778-189-0.
- Hood, Walter (15 September 2008). "Reimagining Center Street" (PDF). Places. 20 (2: Climate Change and Place): 85–87.
- Hood, Walter (2008). "Color Fields". In Treib, Marc (ed.). Representing Landscape Architecture. New York, NY: Taylor & Francis. ISBN 978-0-415-70043-6.
- Hood, Walter (2005). "Landscape as Social Infrastructure". In Raxworthy, Julian; Blood, Jessica (eds.). The MESH Book: Landscape/infrastructure. Melbourne: RMIT University Press. ISBN 978-0-86459-308-5.
- Hood, Walter (2004). "Awakening: Quilt Top Patterns in the Third Dimension". In Brown, David; Williams, William (eds.). Row: Trajectories Through the Shotgun House. Houston, TX: Rice University School of Architecture. ISBN 978-1-885232-08-3.
- Hood, Walter (2003). "Low Cost House, or the House that Roared". In Bell, Michael (ed.). 16 Houses: Designing the Public's Private House. New York, NY: Monacelli Press. ISBN 978-1-58093-114-4.
- Hood, Walter; Erikson, Mellissa (2001). "Macon Memories: Remaking Poplar Street, The Shifting Black Cultural Landscape". In Barton, Craig Evan (ed.). Sites of Memory : Perspectives on Architecture and Race. New York, NY: Princeton Architectural Press. ISBN 978-1-56898-233-5.
- Design Culture Now, National Design Triennial, Princeton Architectural Press, NY, 2000
- Everyday Urbanism, Urban Diaries: Improvisation in West Oakland, CA. Monacelli Press, Inc., 1999. ISBN
