= Germane Barnes =

American architect, designer and professor

Germane Barnes (born 1985) is an American architect, designer and an Assistant Professor of Architecture at the University of Miami in Florida. Barnes was a recipient of the 2021 Rome Prize in Architecture and the 2021 Wheelwright Prize.

== Early life and education ==
Barnes was born and raised in the West Side of Chicago, Illinois. He studied at the University of Illinois at Urbana-Champaign where he received a Bachelor's of Science in Architecture in 2008. After graduation, he worked in an architecture practice in Cape Town, South Africa on pro-bono projects for underprivileged communities. Upon return to the United States, he attended Graduate School and received a Master of Architecture degree from Woodbury University in Burbank, California, where he was awarded the Graduate Thesis Prize.

== Career ==
Continuing his professional experience, he became a designer in residence for the Opa Locka Community Development Corporation in Florida, providing design solutions for communities in need. During the residency he created community events based around the abandoned buildings in the Triangle area of Opa Locka, and helped residents transform an abandoned lot into a community park. He later established his own practice Studio Barnes, LLC in Miami.

Barnes received a research grant from the Graham Foundation in 2018 for this project proposal 'Sacred Stoops: Typological Studies of Black Congregational Spaces'. Within this scholarship, he was able to analyze five American cities (Atlanta, Washington D.C., Chicago, Detroit, Houston) with the focus on architectural typologies in relationship to African-American culture. In February 2021, his work was part of the MoMA Exhibition Reconstructions: Architecture and Blackness in America. It was MoMA’s first architecture exhibition highlighting the synthesis between architecture and African-American cultures and communities. He was a founding member of the Black Reconstruction Collective, a group created by members of the MoMA show. New York Times' Art and Design critic Michael Kimmelman wrote that the group's intention is to “reclaim the larger civic promise of architecture.”

Barnes has been commissioned by Jack Guthman, chairman of the Chicago Architecture Biennial and Chicago Mayor Lori Lightfoot, to create work for the 2021 Chicago Architecture Biennial.

== Awards ==
Barnes was awarded the 2021 Wheelwright Prize by Harvard University Graduate School of Design. The award is aimed to support early career creatives within their design research. He was also a recipient of the 2021 Rome Prize in Architecture from the American Academy in Rome and was awarded the Architectural League Prize for Young Architects + Designers.
