= Ball-Nogues Studio =

Benjamin Ball and Gaston Nogues
- Education: Southern California Institute of Architecture
- Known for: Architecture, Public Art, Installation Art, Site-specific Art
- Notable work: Maximilian's Schell, Air Garden, Pulp Pavilion, Cradle
- Website: ball-nogues.com

Ball-Nogues Studio is a design and fabrication practice based in Los Angeles, California, founded by Benjamin Ball and Gaston Nogues, and currently led by Benjamin Ball. The studio's work falls between the categories of art, architecture and industrial design. The practice is known for creating site-specific architectural installations out of unorthodox materials such as stainless steel ball-chain and spheres, paper pulp, garments, and coffee tables. The studio focuses on the process of creation, with an emphasis on the research and exploration of materials and fabrication methods. Much of the studio's work involves expanding the potential of materials and manufacturing techniques.

== Biography ==
Ball was born in Waterloo, Iowa, where he was influenced by his mother's role as a theater director, while Nogues, from Buenos Aires, was inspired by his father's work in aerospace engineering. The two met as undergraduate students at the Southern California Institute of Architecture in the early 1990s. Upon graduation, Ball worked as a set and production designer for films (including work on the Matrix series), music videos, and commercials with influential directors such as Mark Romanek and Tony Scott. He also contributed to more traditional architectural projects including working on medical facilities, residential projects, and commercial projects such as the Walt Disney Concert Hall.

After graduating from SCI-Arc, Nogues moved directly into a position at Gehry Partners, where he worked in product design and production, becoming a specialist in creative fabrication. He remained at Gehry Partners until 2005, except for a one-year stint in 1996 as an assistant curator at a fine arts publishing house, Gemini GEL.

== Work ==
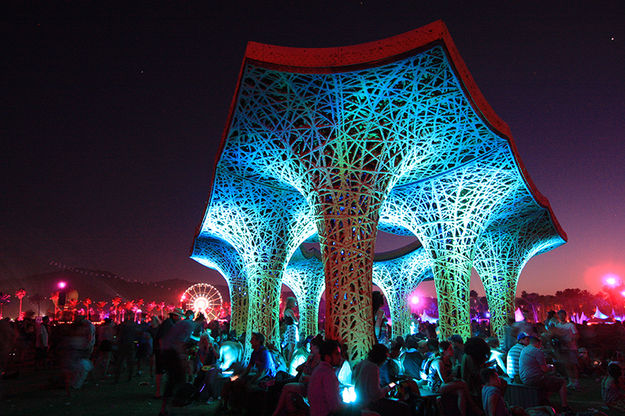
Pulp Pavilion by Ball-Nogues Studio at the 2015 Coachella Valley Music and Arts Festival

Ball and Nogues collaborated on their first joint project, entitled Maximilian's Schell, in 2005. The installation was located in the courtyard of Materials & Applications, an architecture gallery space in Los Angeles, California. The piece was a multi-story structure made of semi-translucent, semi-reflective Mylar petals that resembled a colorful vortex. The work received substantial recognition, including a Los Angeles American Institute of Architects Design Award in 2006, I.D. Magazine’s Annual Design Review for Best of Category for Environments in 2006; and as an Emerging Architecture Finalist for the Mies Crown Hall Americas Prize in 2014.

The studio has also completed three installations for the Coachella Valley Music and Arts Festival: Copper Droopscape in 2008, Elastic Plastic Sponge in 2009, and Pulp Pavilion in 2015. In 2015, Architect Magazine bestowed the First Award for its 2015 R+D Awards to the studio for Pulp Pavilion, noting that the “project’s innovative design, ambitious scale, and novel use of a recycled material wowed the jury.” The pavilion was made of recycled paper pulp, a material that the studio had been experimenting with and developing for several years. It comprised seven 20-foot-tall woven tree forms and spanned 1,300 square feet.

Other notable works include Skin and Bones: Parallel Practices in Fashion and Architecture, a temporary installation at the Museum of Contemporary Art, Los Angeles (MOCA), a temporary event environment for Tiffany & Company’s formal introduction of the Frank Gehry jewelry and accessories line, made of 4,000 layers of corrugated cardboard sandwiched together, and Liquid Sky, a kaleidoscopic Mylar shade structure created by the studio as the winner of the Museum of Modern Art (MoMA) P.S.1 Young Architects Program competition.

== List of selected artworks and exhibitions ==
=== Permanent commissions ===
- Drop-In Distraction, Los Angeles County Permit Office, Los Angeles, CA (2009)
- Cradle, Santa Monica Place, Public Artwork, Santa Monica, CA (2010)
- Cloud, Screen, Veil, Three public commissions, Mercy Housing, San Francisco, CA (2010–11)
- Talus Dome, Edmonton, Alberta, Canada (2011)
- Waterline, San Diego County Operations Center, San Diego, CA (2012)
- Euphony, Music City Center, Nashville, TN (2013)
- Air Garden, Bradley West Terminal, Los Angeles International Airport, Los Angeles, CA (2013)
- Stud Wall, Public art commission, West Hollywood, CA (2014)
- Corner Glory, Public art commission, West Hollywood, CA (2014)
- Donor Wall, Del E. Webb Performing Arts Center, Wickenburg, AZ (2014)
- The Fact of Seeing Without Sense, Veterans Affairs Aquatic Center, Palo Alto, CA (2014)
- The Apparent Junction of Earth and Sky, Veterans Affairs Aquatic Center, Palo Alto, CA (2014)
- Not Whole Fence, Southwest University Park, El Paso, TX (2014)
- Sundial, Jefferson County Government Center – Golden Station, Golden, CO (2014)
- Orchard, El Cariso Park, Sylmar, CA (2015)
- Proscenium, Lincoln Hall, Portland State University, Portland, OR (2015)
- Suspension #13, General Classroom Building, Colorado State University, Pueblo, CO (2016)

=== Temporary commissions and installations ===
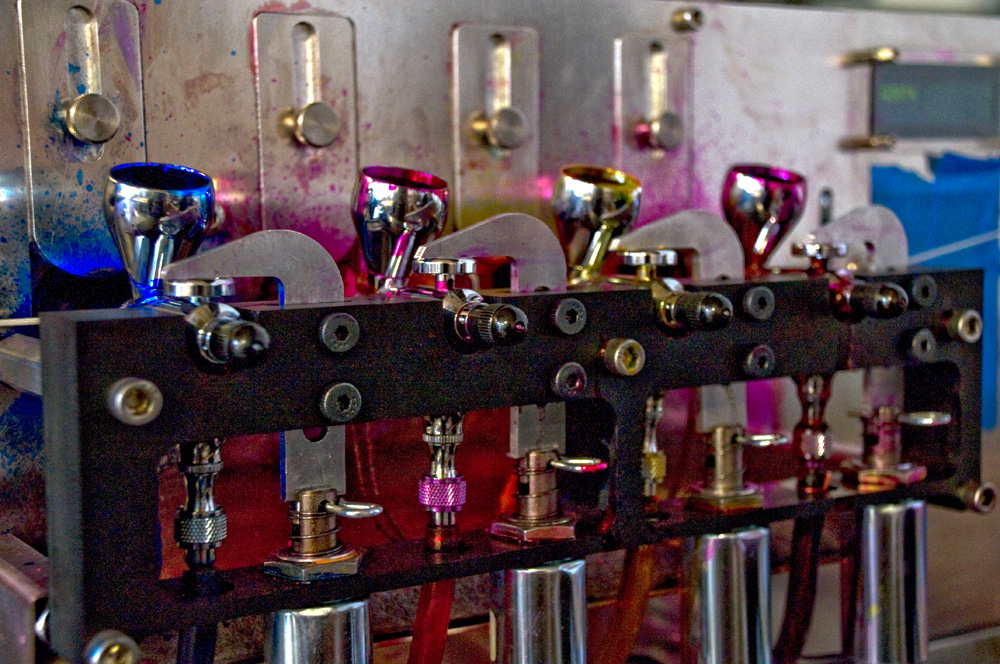
Insta-llator 1 with the Variable Information Atomizing Module, a digitally controlled cutting and dying machine developed by Ball-Nogues Studio (2009).

- Maximilian's Schell, Materials & Applications, Los Angeles, CA (2005)
- Untitled Hanging Installation, Kunst Universitat, Linz, Austria (2006)
- Skin + Bones, Parallel Practices in Fashion and Architecture Fete, MOCA, Los Angeles, CA (2006)
- Tiffany and Company, Frank Gehry Jewelry Launch, Beverly Hills, CA (2006)
- Rip Curl Canyon, Rice University Art Gallery, Houston, TX (2006)
- Liquid Sky, PS1 Contemporary Art Center, Long Island City, NY (2008)
- Unseen Current, Extension Gallery, Chicago, IL (2008)
- Copper Droopscape, Coachella Valley Music and Arts Festival, Indio, CA (2008)
- Echoes Converge, Venice Biennale of Architecture, Venice, Italy (2008)
- Spock’s Blocks, The Urban Art Biennale, Bordeaux, France (2009)
- Exposed, Arts Council of Long Beach, Long Beach, CA (2009)
- Elastic Plastic Sponge, Coachella Valley Music and Arts Festival, Indio, CA (2009)
- Feathered Edge: A New Installation by Ball-Nogues Studio, MOCA Pacific Design Center, Los Angeles, CA (2009)
- Built to Wear, Shenzhen & Hong Kong Bi-City Biennale of Urbanism and Architecture, Shenzhen, China (2009)
- Double Back-to-Basics, LACMA gallery at Charles W. White School, Los Angeles, CA (2010)
- Table Cloth, Schoenberg Hall, University of California, Los Angeles, CA (2010)
- Gravity’s Loom, Indianapolis Museum of Art, Indianapolis, IN (2010)
- Yucca Crater, High Desert Test Sites, Near 29 Palms, CA (2011)
- Yevrus 1, Negative Impression, SCI-Arc Gallery, Los Angeles, CA (2012)
- Pavillon Speciale, École Spéciale d’Architecture, Paris, France (2012)
- K.A.M.P. (Kids Art Museum Project), The Hammer Museum, Los Angeles, CA (2013)
- Transamerica, Modernist Icon: The Architecture and Urban Planning of William L. Pereira, Nevada Museum of Art, Reno, NV (2013)
- Pulp Pavilion, Coachella Valley Music and Arts Festival, Indio, CA (2015)

=== Group exhibitions ===
- Young Architects Program, Museum of Modern Art, New York, NY (2007)
- Architects without Architecture, Shore Institute of Contemporary Art, Long Branch, NJ (2008)
- Beijing Biennale, Beijing, China (2008)
- Urban Interventions, Boston Society of Architects, Boston, MA (2009)
- Flux, California College of the Arts, San Francisco, CA (2009)
- From My Universe: Objects of Desire, See Line Gallery at the Pacific Design Center, Los Angeles, CA (2009)
- Cité de l'architecture et du Patrimoine, Paris, France (2010)
- Contemplating the Void, Solomon R. Guggenheim Museum, New York, NY (2010)
- Room Mobile, See The Line Gallery at the Pacific Design Center, Los Angeles, CA (2010)
- Spontaneous Schooling Exhibition, London Festival of Architecture Event, Nous Gallery, London, England (2010)
- Self Structure, Le Lieu du Design, Paris, France (2011)
- Net Works: An Atlas of Connective and Distributive Intelligence in Architecture, Architectural Association, London, England (2011)
- WBA3: Architecture in the Expanded Field, Wattis Gallery, California College of the Arts, San Francisco, CA (2012)
- A New Sculpturalism: Contemporary Architecture in Southern California, MOCA Geffen, Los Angeles, CA (2013)
- 6018 Wilshire, Edward Cella Art & Architecture, Los Angeles, CA (2014)
- Almost Anything Goes: Architecture and Inclusivity, Museum of Contemporary Art Santa Barbara, CA (2014)
- Constructions, Edward Cella Art & Architecture, Los Angeles, CA (2015)
- Xenotypes, Design Matters Gallery, Los Angeles, CA, (2015)

== Recognition ==
Ball-Nogues Studio has received three American Institute of Architects Design Awards, United States Artists Target Fellowship and a grant from the Graham Foundation for Advanced Studies in the Fine Arts. In 2007, the Studio was the winner of the Museum of Modern Art PS1 Young Architects Program Competition. Their work is part of the permanent collections of both MoMA and LACMA. In 2011, they were one of the Architectural League of New York’s Emerging Voices and, in 2014, they were finalists for the Illinois Institute of Technology College of Architecture's Mies Crown Hall Americas Prize.

Benjamin and Gaston have taught in the graduate architecture programs at SCI-Arc, UCLA, and USC. Their work has appeared in a variety of publications including The New York Times, Los Angeles Times, The Guardian, Architectural Record, Artforum, Icon, Log, Architectural Digest, Mark and Sculpture.
