= Embassy of the United States, Tokyo =

Diplomatic mission of the United States to Japan

Embassy of the United States in Tokyo 駐日アメリカ合衆国大使館

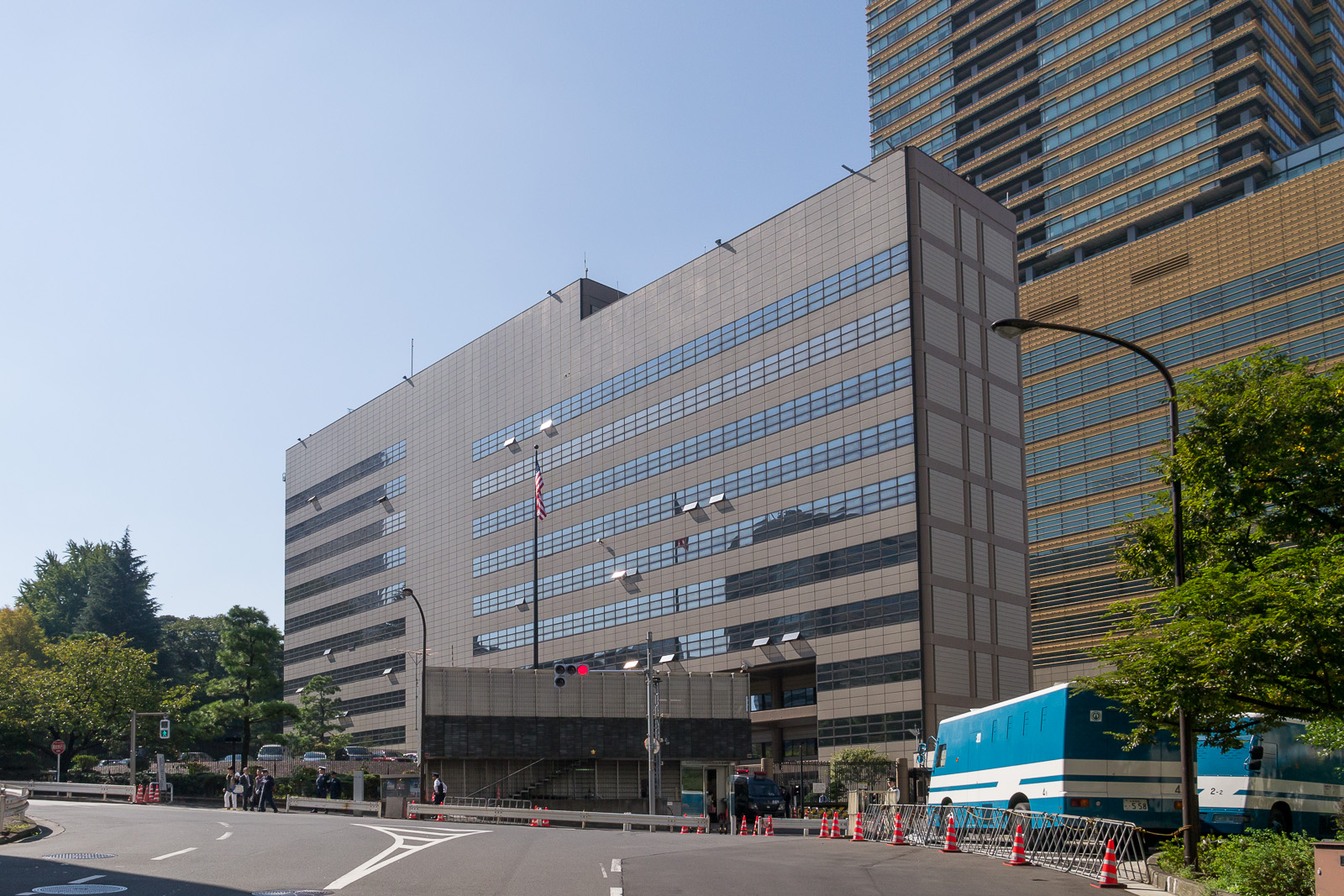
- Location: 1-10-5 Akasaka, Minato, Tokyo 107-8420, Japan
- Coordinates: 35.66861°N 139.74328°E
- Opened: 1976
- Ambassador: George Edward Glass
- Jurisdiction: Japan
- Website: Official website

The Embassy of the United States of America in Tokyo (駐日アメリカ合衆国大使館 Chū Nichi Amerikagasshūkoku Taishikan) is the embassy of the United States in Tokyo, Japan. Along with consulates in Osaka, Nagoya, Sapporo, Fukuoka, and Naha, the embassy is part of the U.S. Mission Japan and provides assistance to American citizens and residents who live in Japan and issues visas to Japanese nationals, and legal residents in Japan who wish to visit or immigrate to the United States.

The current ambassador is George Edward Glass, who assumed office on April 18, 2025.

The current chancery building was designed by César Pelli and Norma Merrick Sklarek, and was completed in 1976 and replaced a previous chancery on the site. The ambassador's official residence, built together with the previous chancery in 1931, was one of the first buildings purpose-built by the U.S. as an ambassador's residence. Both structures were designed by Raymond & Magonigle, a special collaboration comprising the respected American architect Harold Van Buren Magonigle and younger, Tokyo-based Antonin Raymond, who had previously worked for Magonigle and was more familiar with building codes and processes in Japan. The 1931 buildings blended Beaux-Arts planning, modern construction, and traditional ornament drawn from Japanese sources; describing their approach, Raymond noted "The Embassy buildings are not modern in their design, but neither do they reflect any period."

The ambassador's residence served as the historic meeting place between Emperor Shōwa (Hirohito) and General Douglas MacArthur on September 27, 1945, after the surrender of Japan in World War II.

In January 2001, the U.S. Department of State authorized the Residence of the U.S. ambassador to Japan to be labeled an important cultural asset.

In August 2021, while visiting Japan for the Tokyo Olympics, First Lady Jill Biden dedicated a room in the U.S. ambassador's residence to the late U.S. Sen. Daniel K. Inouye and his wife, Irene.

== Location ==
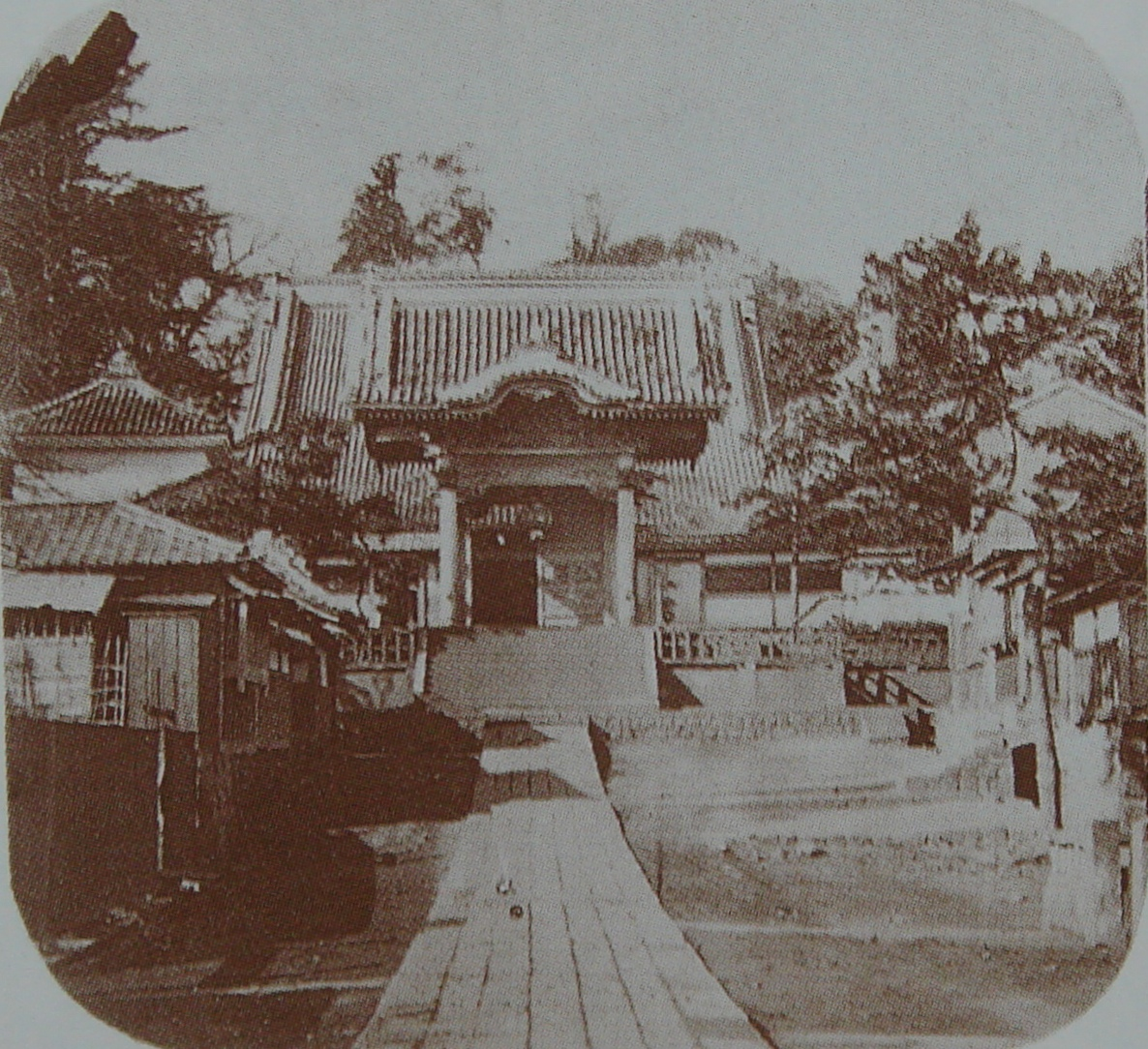
First U.S. mission in Japan

The main gate of the Embassy (photographed in 2004). Embassy building (right), Japanese police station (left).

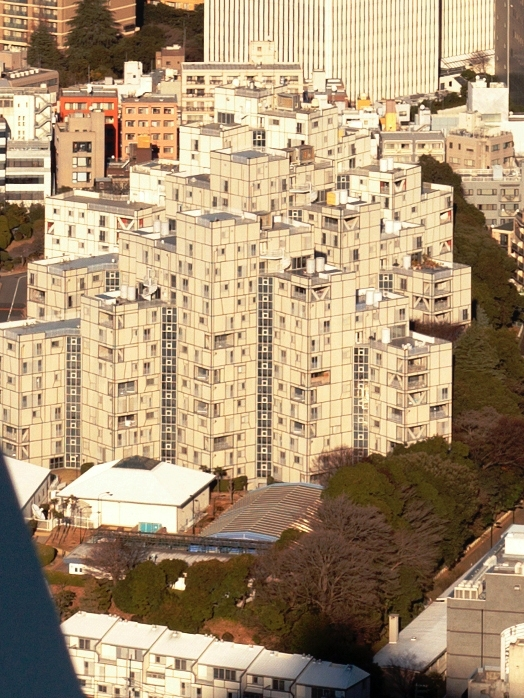
Housing for U.S. Embassy staff in Roppongi-Nichōme, Minato, Tokyo

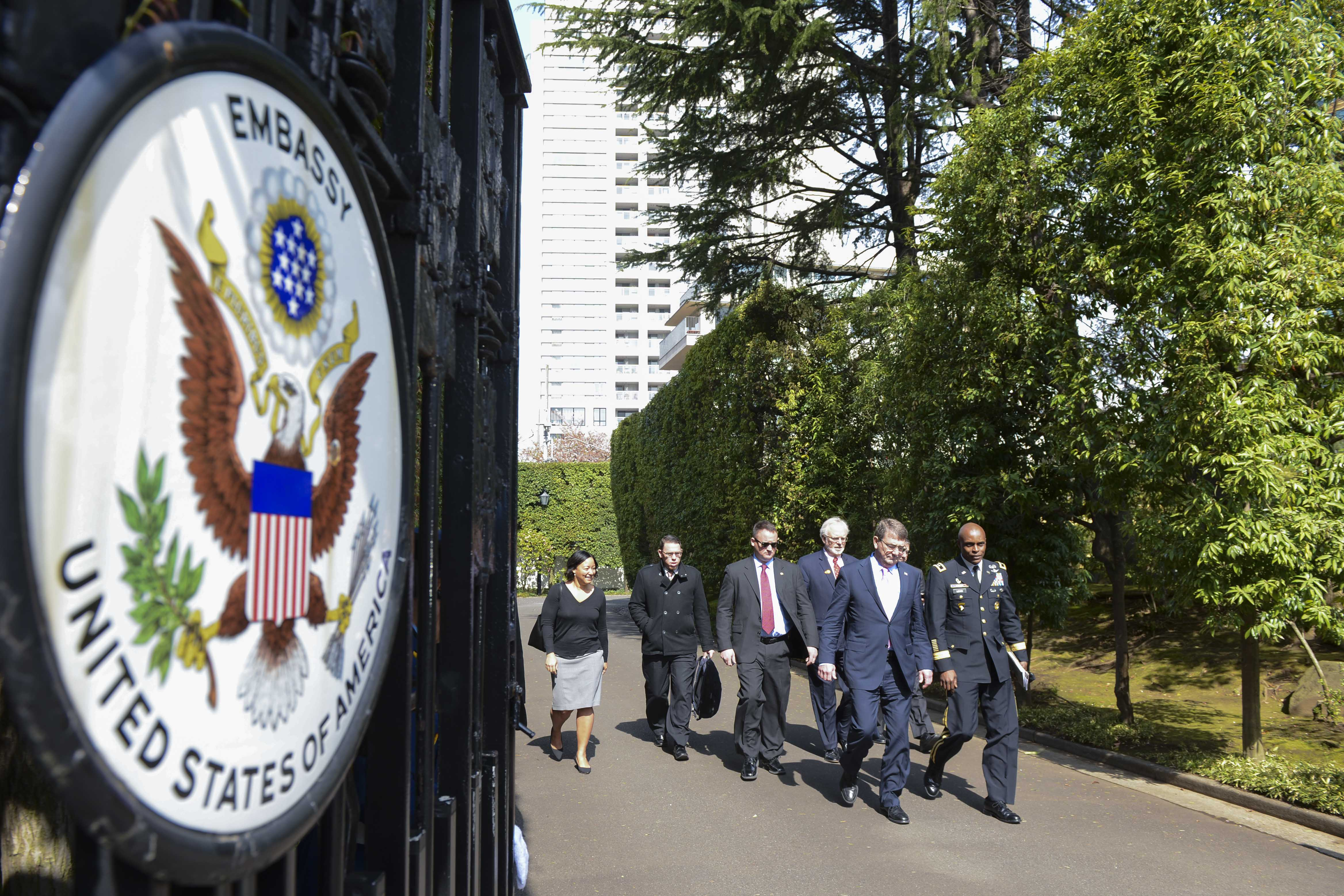
U.S. secretary of defense Ashton Carter leaves a meeting at the Ambassador's Residence, located on the embassy grounds

The embassy is located in the Akasaka neighborhood of Minato, Tokyo, steps away from the Nagatachō district, home of the National Diet and the Prime Minister's residence. The address is 1–10–5, Akasaka, Minato-ku Post Code: 107–8420. It is easily accessible via the Tokyo Metro Ginza or Namboku Lines Tameike-Sannō Station and conveniently located close to the Hotel Okura.

== History ==
=== Previous U.S. missions in Japan ===
The first American consulate in Japan was opened at the temple of Gyokusen-ji, Shimoda, Shizuoka under Consul General Townsend Harris. Gyokusen-ji is also the location of a small number of foreign graves dating from as early as 1854 marking the final resting place of U.S. forces personnel that died while serving as part of Commodore Matthew Perry's 'Black Ship' fleet.

Harris negotiated the Treaty of Amity and Commerce between the two countries, which was signed at nearby Ryōsen-ji in 1858.

The United States established its first legation in Tokyo in 1859 under Townsend Harris. This legation was located at Zenpukuji, a Buddhist temple in the Motoazabu neighborhood of southern Tokyo.

In 1875, the legation was moved to a site on the Sumida River near Tsukiji, in an area slated as a district for foreigners outside the employ of the Japanese government; this site is now occupied by the St. Luke's Garden complex.

The legation moved to the current embassy site in 1890.

In January 1906, following Japan's victory in the Russo-Japanese War, Japan and the U.S. mutually elevated their legates to the rank of ambassador. Several European powers did so at the same time, indicating a perception of equality between Japan and the major Western powers.

=== World War II ===
The U.S. Embassy in Tokyo and the Embassy of Japan in Washington, D.C. were closed shortly following the attack on Pearl Harbor and the start of Pacific War on December 7, 1941. American ambassador to Japan Joseph Grew and American embassy personnel, including military attachés, were interned on the grounds of the embassy until June 1942, when they were sent by ship to Portuguese East Africa and handed over for repatriation. Simultaneously, Japanese diplomats who had been in the U.S. were handed over for repatriation.

The U.S. Embassy in Tokyo remained closed during the Allied occupation, as the U.S. was the occupying power in Japan. On April 18, 1946, SCAP General Order 18 established the Diplomatic Section as the primary diplomatic representation of the United States during this period, which was staffed by some State Department employees. Following restoration of diplomatic relations under the Treaty of San Francisco, the U.S. Embassy reopened on April 28, 1952. Robert D. Murphy arrived to serve as the American ambassador to Japan after World War II. The Embassy of Japan in Washington, D.C. also reopened on the same day.

=== Rent payment issue ===
The land on which the embassy sits is about 13,000 m^{2} (3.21 acres), and has been leased from the Japanese government since 1896. In 2005, it was reported that the U.S. government had made no payments for the embassy's premises since 1998 after failing to agree on a renewal of the lease agreement. In 2007, the two governments agreed to renew the lease through 2027, following which the U.S. government paid its unpaid rent. The annual rent for the underlying land was set at 7 million yen for 1998–2007, 10 million yen for 2008–12, and 15 million yen for 2013–27. The very low rent amount for the land is due to the age of the lease agreement, and the fact that it originally contained no escalation or adjustment provisions.

== U.S. Consulates in Japan ==
- U.S. Consulate General Naha (Urasoe, Okinawa Prefecture)
- U.S. Consulate General Osaka-Kobe (Osaka, Osaka Prefecture)
- U.S. Consulate General Sapporo (Sapporo, Hokkaido)
- U.S. Consulate Fukuoka (Fukuoka, Fukuoka Prefecture)
- U.S. Consulate Nagoya (Nagoya, Aichi Prefecture)

== See also ==
- List of ambassadors of the United States to Japan
- Japan–United States relations
- United States Forces Japan
