= Katherine Diamond =

American architect

- Born: April 9, 1954 (age 72)
- Education: The Technion
- Occupation: Architect
- Practice: HDR

Katherine Diamond (born April 9, 1954), is an American architect. She was born in Chicago, went to college in Israel, where she served in the Israeli Air Force. She then returned to the US.

== Education ==
Diamond completed her undergrad at the Technion-Machon Technologi Le' Israel.

== Career ==
Diamond is a Design principal at HDR in Los Angeles, California. She has also worked at HMC, NBBJ, RNL. With Norma Sklarek and Margot Siegel, Diamond founded the Los Angeles firm Siegel, Sklarek and Diamond, the largest woman-owned firm of the time which then became Siegel Diamond Architects.

From 1993 to 1994, she was the first woman to serve as President of the Los Angeles chapter of the American Institute of Architects in 99 years. In 1996, she was elected the College of Fellows of the American Institute of Architects (FAIA) and was the president of the Association for Women in Architecture from 1985 to 1987 She also is on the National Peer Review Council for the GSA Design Excellence Program and taught design studios at University of Southern California, School of Architecture.

== Awards ==
- Los Angeles Business Council Urban Beautification Award – for Baldwin Park Commuter Rail Station
- Los Angeles Business Council Urban Beautification Award – for design of 4 Elevated Light Rail Stations
- National Commercial Builders Council Award of Excellence – for the Park Beyond the Park, Torrance, CA
- US Air Force Design Award – for concept design of Personnel Support Faculty
- City of Los Angeles Beautification Award – for Otto Nemenz International Building

== Exhibitions ==
- 100 Projects – 100 Years – AIA Los Angeles Chapter
- Broadening the Discourse – Los Angeles, California Women in Environmental Design exhibit
- The Exceptional One and Many More
- Women in American Architecture 1988–1989: A Southern California Perspective -AIA Los Angeles Chapter/Women in Architecture exhibit

== Notable projects ==
- LAX Air Traffic Control Tower
- Central Utility Plant with Co-Generation UC Davis Medical Center
- Universal City Metro Rail Station
- UCI Student Services Addition
- New Jefferson Elementary School
- Baldwin Park Commuter Rail Station
- Richstone Family Center
- Joint USA / Canadian Port of Entry at Sweetgrass, Montana / Coutts, Alberta
- UC Davis Medical Center Central Plant
- The US Magistrate Courthouse, Bakersfield CA
- The District Courthouse, Billings Montana
