= Madlener House =

Historic house in Illinois, United States

- Albert F. Madlener House
- U.S. National Register of Historic Places
- Chicago Landmark
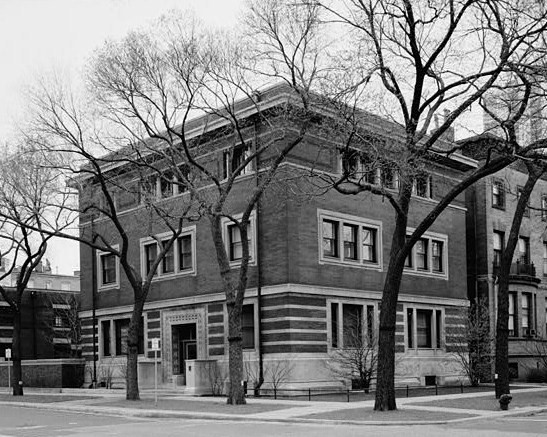
- 1964 HABS photo

- Location within Chicago metropolitan area Location within Illinois Location within the United States
- Location: 4 W. Burton St., Chicago, Illinois
- Coordinates: 41°54′35″N 87°37′45″W
- Built: 1902
- Architect: Schimdt, Richard E.
- Architectural style: Prairie School
- NRHP reference No.: 70000234

Significant dates
- Added to NRHP: October 15, 1970
- Designated CHICL: March 22, 1973

The Madlener House, also known as the Albert F. Madlener House, is a 20th-century mansion located in the Gold Coast neighborhood of Chicago, Illinois, USA. It is the work of architect Richard E. Schmidt (1865-1958) and designer Hugh M.G. Garden (1873-1961). Commissioned in 1901 and completed in 1902, the house was built as the residence for Albert Fridolin Madlener, a German-American brewery owner, and his wife, Elsa Seipp Madlener. Since 1963, it has been the headquarters of the Graham Foundation for Advanced Studies in the Fine Arts.

In 1970, The Madlener House was placed on the National Register of Historic Places, and in 1973, it came under the protection of a Chicago ordinance protecting the city's historical and architectural landmarks. Today, a Chicago Landmark plaque is affixed to its south-facing façade. The house was fully remodeled and renovated by architect Daniel Brenner (1917-1977) in 1963–64.

== History and Creation ==
Albert Madlener was the son of prominent liquor distiller and merchant Fridolin Madlener, who had come to Chicago from Baden, Germany. After attending the Latin School of Chicago and Yale University and serving a winery apprenticeship in Germany, Albert took over the family liquor business. He married Elsa Seipp, the daughter of another famous Chicago brewer, in January 1898. Three years later, as Elsa was expecting their first child, Albert commissioned his brother-in-law, Richard E. Schmidt to design and construct a new house on west Burton Place in the Gold Coast. Schmidt was only thirty-five years old at the time. The architect and his collaborator, designer Hugh M.G. Garden, accepted the commission, and the home was completed one year later in 1902.

== Architecture ==
Former Graham Foundation director Carter Manny described the Madlener House as "an unusually successful amalgamation of tradition and innovation in architecture, a harmonious reflection of its time and place." This amalgamation refers to the eclectic usages of then-popular architectural styles in the Midwest and abroad, as well as the incorporation of both organic and geometric design elements. The high-ceiling, cubic foundation of the house is an influence of the German Neoclassical work of Karl Friedrich Schinkel and others in Berlin, Germany. However, many of the house's details derive from Chicago's own Prairie School movement, made famous by Louis Sullivan and Frank Lloyd Wright. Past writings have compared the Madlener House to both Villa Shone in Berlin and Frank Lloyd's Wright's Winslow House in River Forest, Illinois. Other details of the house's interior reflect the International Arts and Crafts movement, popular at the time of the house's construction at the turn of the twentieth century.

In keeping with the Prairie School's appreciation of local building materials, the exterior of the Madlener House is constructed of Indiana Limestone. The architects gave special attention to the entryway, with an original octagonal ornament designed by Gardner and delicate bronze grill work inspired by the designs of Wright and Sullivan.

Circassion walnut from the Black Sea region clads the foyer and grand staircase and is used in a bookmatch treatment. The foyer fireplace is of Indiana limestone. Embedded in this fireplace is the most prominent tribute to the Arts and Crafts movement in the house: Albert Van Den Berghen's bronze relief, "Spirit of the Waves."

The exhibition spaces on the first floor (once the music room, living room, and dining room) are trimmed with bleached mahogany. The wooden inlay of this trim matches the simple yet intricate design found on the doorway grill work. The intricate dining room ceiling is painted cast plaster with a design of juxtaposed geometric and organic patterns. The most dramatic part of the house is the third floor ballroom, where the Madleners established their reputation for gracious and plentiful entertaining.

Unusual traits of the house are its lack of chimney-tops and its large but low-placed windows. Russell Sturgis, in a review of the house for Architectural Record, criticized, "A window of ordinary height . . . has a whole row of panes of glass at a higher level than the highest glass of these large windows in the Chicago house." Thirty-four drawings of the Madlener House are archived with the Architecture and Design Department of the Art Institute of Chicago.

== "Spirit of Waves" sculpture ==
A relief sculpture by the Belgian architect Albert Van Den Berghen was commissioned by the Madlener family and Richard Schmidt some time after the house's completion. Schmidt, who had met the Belgian sculptor in 1900, stated that "it was his [Berghen’s] idea that the panel should portray something of the lake, an idea which he carried out by representing waves and two or three mermaids." A plaster maquette of "Spirit of Waves" was exhibited at the Chicago Architectural Club in 1906.

== Architectural Fragment Sculpture Garden ==
The Madlener House also holds a significant collection of late nineteenth and early twentieth century architectural fragments from such architects as Louis Sullivan, Dankmar Adler, H.H. Richardson, Frank Lloyd Wright, John H. Edelmann, Raymond Hood and George Elmslie, retrieved from Chicago buildings that are now primarily demolished. The fragments are gifts from various Chicagoans, architects, and architecture enthusiasts and occupy the courtyard garden and certain walls of the library.

== Graham Foundation for Advanced Studies in the Fine Arts ==
Founded in 1956, the Graham Foundation for Advanced Studies in the Fine Arts makes project-based grants and produces public programs about architecture and its role in the arts, culture, and society. The Foundation was created from a bequest of Chicago architect Ernest R. Graham.

=== Madlener House and the Graham Foundation ===
Albert Madlener died in 1947, and his wife, Elsa, in 1962. Title to the house then passed to their son, Albert, Jr., who sold it to a real-estate developer shortly after inheriting the home. After suggestions were proposed from razing the house for high-rise apartment buildings to turning it into the mayor's residence, the Graham Foundation, then in its infancy, came forward to purchase the house.

Since 1963, the Madlener House has been owned and operated by the Graham Foundation for Advanced Studies in the Fine Arts. In its first year of ownership, the Graham Foundation commissioned architect Daniel Brenner to make significant interior alterations to the house, removing many of its partitions and domestic accoutrements in order to better suit the foundation's philanthropic and educational activities. The mahogany in the new exhibition rooms was bleached, while the walnut foyer remained the same. The kitchen was converted into a library that now houses all of the publications funded by the foundation since it was founded. The ballroom was converted into a lecture hall and performance space, and various rooms on the second and third floors were converted into offices and galleries. In 1964, with the bulk of the renovation underway, the city of Chicago and the Commission on Chicago Architectural Landmarks designated the Madlener House an official city landmark.

=== Activities ===
Today, the Madlener House is directed by Sarah Herda the main venue for the Graham Foundation's various public programs, including exhibitions, talks, performances, and meetings. Admission is free.

==== Recent exhibitions ====
Architects and others featured in recent exhibitions include Barbara Kasten, Lina Bo Bardi, Jimenez Lai, Lawrence Halprin and Anna Halprin, Sylvia Lavin, Judy Ledgerwood, Peter Lang, Thomas Demand, Richard Pare, Stanley Tigerman, Jack Stauffacher, Nancy Holt, Anne Tyng, Robert Venturi and Denise Scott Brown, Felipe Dulzaides, Cecil Balmond, Bjarke Ingels Group. Sou Fujimoto

== See also ==
- The Graham Foundation for Advanced Studies in the Fine Arts
- Visual arts of Chicago
- Architecture of Chicago
- Prairie School
