= Norma Merrick Sklarek =

American architect (1926–2012)

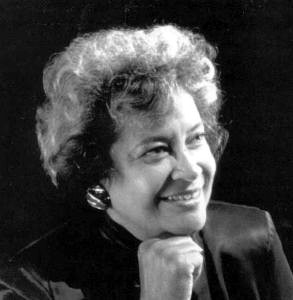
- Born: Norma Merrick; April 15, 1926; Harlem, New York City, U.S.
- Died: February 6, 2012 (aged 85); Pacific Palisades, Los Angeles, California, U.S.
- Education: Barnard College; Columbia Graduate School of Architecture, Planning and Preservation
- Occupation: Architect
- Awards: Fellow of the American Institute of Architects
- Practice: Skidmore, Owings & Merrill; Gruen and Associates; Welton Becket; Siegel-Sklarek-Diamond
- Buildings: Embassy of the United States in Tokyo, Pacific Design Center

Norma Merrick Sklarek (April 15, 1926 – February 6, 2012) was an American architect. Sklarek was the first African American woman to become a licensed architect in the states of New York (1954) and California (1962), as well as the first Black woman to become a member of the American Institute of Architects (AIA). Her notable works include the United States Embassy in Tokyo, Japan (1976) and the Terminal One station at the Los Angeles International Airport (1984). Sklarek is credited with helping to pave the way for other female and minority architects. AIA board member Anthony Costello called her the “Rosa Parks of architecture” in the AIA newsletter.

== Early life and education ==
Norma Merrick Sklarek was born on April 15, 1926, in Harlem, New York. Her parents, Dr. Walter Ernest Merrick, a doctor, and Amy Merrick (née Willoughby), a seamstress, were immigrants from Trinidad. She grew up in Crown Heights, Brooklyn. At home, Norma's father engaged her in a wide range of activities, including fishing, painting, and carpentry. For high school, Norma attended Hunter College High School, an all-girls magnet school with a predominantly white student body. Norma excelled academically, keeping up with the rigors of academic study. Noticing Norma's propensity towards visual arts and mathematics, her father suggested she pursue architecture as a career.

In 1944, Sklarek enrolled at Barnard College. After one year, she transferred to Columbia University, where she pursued architectural design studies. She graduated in 1950 with a Bachelors of Architecture, as one of only a handful of women, and the only African American woman in her class.

== Career ==
After receiving her degree, Sklarek was denied employment by 19 architectural firms. She accepted a position as junior draftsperson at the New York Department of Public Works. After four years of dissatisfaction with the position, Sklarek registered for the New York State architect's licensure examination, hoping that this certification would allow her access to employment at an architecture firm. In 1954, Sklarek became the first Black woman to become a licensed architect in the state of New York, after passing the licensure exam on her first try. Within a year of attaining her license, she was hired at Skidmore, Owings & Merrill, a position that exposed her to hands-on, skill-building projects. Sklarek would maintain this position at SOM for a five-year period that became the foundation for her career as an architect. During this time, Sklarek also taught architecture at the New York City Community College.

In 1960, Sklarek accepted the position of the first female vice president for Gruen and Associates in Los Angeles, where she would work for two decades. Two years later, in 1962, Sklarek became the first African American woman architect to be licensed in the state of California. In 1966, she was promoted to the role of director. Sklarek was responsible for hiring and supervising associates, while simultaneously facilitating major design projects, such as California Mart, Pacific Design Center, Fox Hills Mall, San Bernardino City Hall, Leo Baeck Temple and the Embassy of the United States in Tokyo. Sklarek was often credited as "project architect" rather than "design architect" on most major projects, despite being directly involved in the architectural design process. One exception to this was the credit she received, alongside César Pelli, for designing the Embassy of the United States in Tokyo. The practice of crediting male designers in the face of female designers was commonplace during Sklarek's career, spurring the posthumous resurgence of interest in her career.

In 1980, Sklarek became the first African American woman to be elevated to the College of Fellows of the American Institute of Architects, after being the first African American woman member of the American Institute of Architects in 1959.

From 1980 to 1985, Sklarek worked at Welton Becket Associates where she served as the project director of the $50-million construction for the Terminal One station at the Los Angeles International Airport. Terminal One became operational in January 1984, just before the city hosted the 1984 Summer Olympics.

After leaving Welton Becket Associates in 1985, Sklarek co-founded her own firm with Margot Siegel AIA and Katherine Diamond FAIA. The firm, Siegel Sklarek Diamond, was the largest woman-owned firm at the time. The firm, under Sklarek's direction, would go on to complete a wide range of projects across southern California, including the Student Counseling and Resource Center (1988) and Early Childhood Education Center (1989) at the University of California Irvine, as well as the Los Angeles Air Traffic Control Tower (1995). Siegel Sklarek Diamond had projects valued at as much as $50 million under way at one time. Hoping to work on larger projects again, Sklarek left the firm in 1989 to join Jon Jerde Partnership as principal. In this final stint of her career, Sklarek would work on the Mall of America.

Sklarek retired in 1992. Following her retirement, Sklarek was appointed by the state governor to serve on the California Architects Board and served as chair of the American Institute of Architects National Ethics Council for several years.

== Personal life ==
Sklarek had two sons named Gregory and David Fairweather as well as three marriages during her career. As a single parent in the start of her career, her mother took the role of watching the children so she could begin her new profession. After being known as Norma Merrick Fairweather in one of her marriages, she changed her last name to Sklarek in 1967 when she married Bauhaus graduate Rolf Sklarek, a Gruen architect whom she met at the Gruen Associates Firm. Rolf Sklarek died in 1984 and she married Dr. Cornelius Welch a few years later.

== Death ==
She died of heart failure on February 6, 2012, at her home in Pacific Palisades, California.

== Awards ==
- Fellow, American Institute of Architects, 1980, first African American woman
- Association of Black Women Entrepreneurs’ Outstanding Business Role Model Award, 1987
- Honored by the National Organization of Minority Architects
- Honored by the Black Women in Sisterhood for Action
- Honorary member of Delta Sigma Theta sorority, 1998
- Norma Merrick Sklarek Architectural Scholarship Award established at Howard University
- Resolution from California State Legislature honoring Norma Merrick Sklarek, 2007
- AIA Whitney M. Young Jr. Award, 2008
- Professional Achievement Award, YWCA Los Angeles, 1987, 1989.
- Keynote Speaker Award, YWCA Cincinnati, 1990.
- Whitney M. Young Jr. Award, American Institute of Architects, 2008.

== Significant buildings ==
Although both Sklarek and César Pelli, while at Gruen Associates, were responsible for designing the United States Embassy in Tokyo, Pelli was mainly accredited for the project, leaving Sklarek unrecognized. Her role was not only in designing the building, but supervising and hiring staff as well. Even though she has done a lot with her collaboration with Pelli, she often is not mentioned for this accomplishment.

The Terminal One station at Los Angeles International Airport (LAX) was another major accomplishment by Sklarek with Welton Becket Associates in 1984, who served as the project director. The Terminal One station was built along with the Tom Bradley International Terminal to facilitate overseas travelers, especially before attending the Summer Olympic Games from July–August of that year. It is known for its extravagant architectural design that was a circular U shape. The $50-million station was constructed nearly two decades later to increase capacity.

== Selected works ==
While a director at Gruen Associates, Sklarek collaborated with César Pelli on a number of projects.

- 1961–66 – Fox Plaza, San Francisco, California
- 1961–63 – California Mart, Los Angeles, California
- 1963–65 – San Bernardino City Hall, San Bernardino, California
- 1972–75 – Pacific Design Center, Los Angeles, California
- 1976–78 – Embassy of the United States in Tokyo, Japan
- 1980 – Santa Monica Place, Santa Monica
- 1984 – Terminal One, Los Angeles International Airport, Los Angeles, California
- 1989–92 – Mall of America, Minneapolis, Minnesota
