= Parkfield =

Parkfield may refer to:

- Parkfield, California, an unincorporated community in California, United States
  - Parkfield earthquake, various earthquakes that have occurred near Parkfield
  - Parkfield Interventional EQ Fieldwork, land art near Parkfield
- Parkfield, Cornwall, a hamlet in Cornwall, United Kingdom
- Parkfield, a park and stadium serving Potters Bar Town F.C. in Potters Bar, Hertfordshire, United Kingdom
- Parkfield Colliery, a former coal mine in South Gloucestershire, United Kingdom
- Parkfield High School, a former secondary school in Wolverhampton, West Midlands, United Kingdom
- Parkfield School, a free school at Bournemouth Airport in Dorset, United Kingdom
- Parkfield, Western Australia, a rural locality

== See also ==
- Park Field, US Army Air Service training camp
