= Talus Dome =

Sculpture in Edmonton

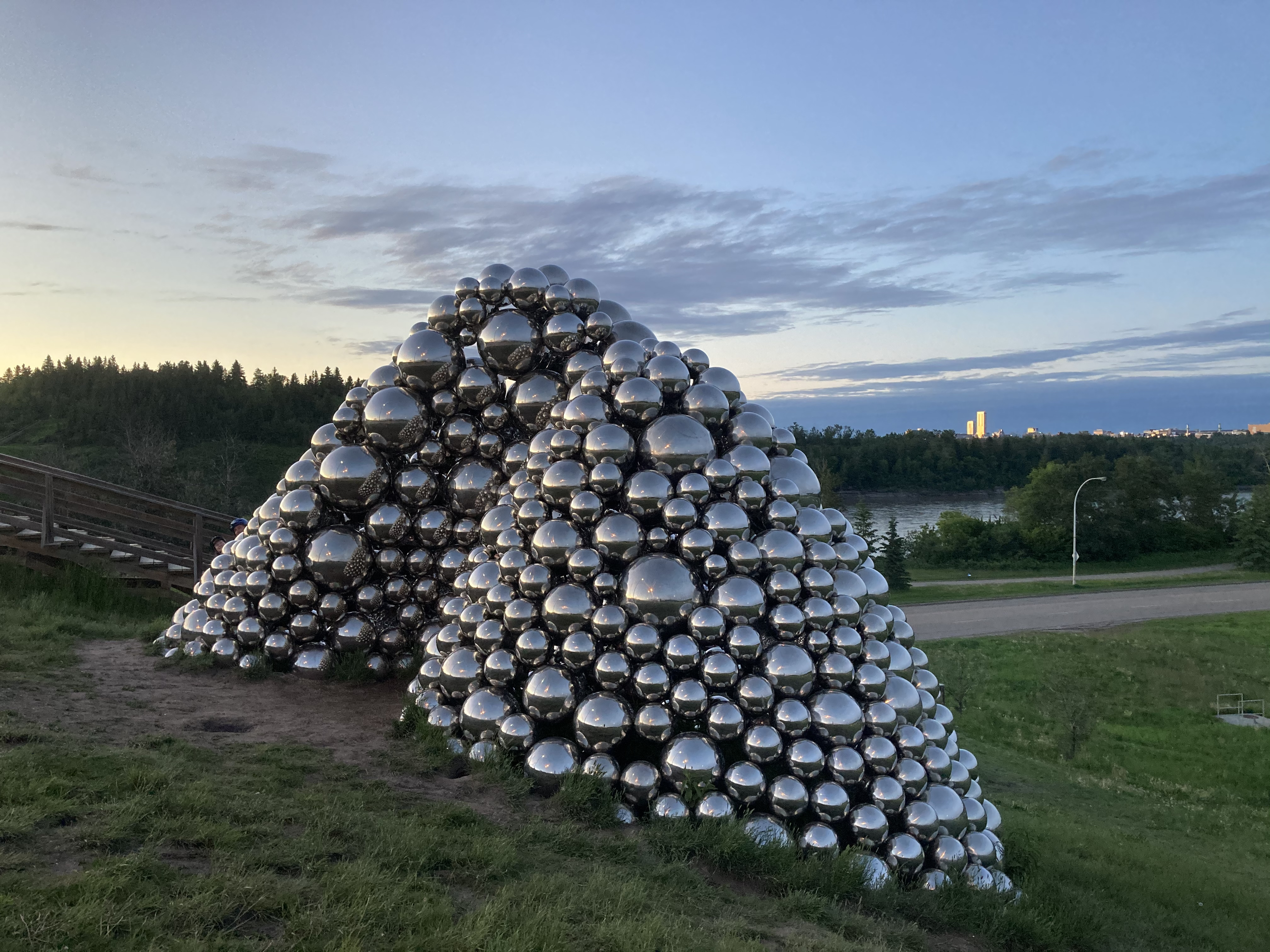
- Artists: Benjamin Ball and Gaston Nogues
- Year: 2011
- Medium: 316L stainless steel
- Location: Edmonton, Alberta; 53°30′16.7″N 113°33′57.2″W

The Talus Dome is a sculpture consisting of nearly 1,000 316L stainless steel spheres of varying size, and is located in the river valley region of Edmonton, Alberta, southeast of the Quesnell Bridge. Designed by Benjamin Ball and Gaston Nogues, two artists from Los Angeles, the sculpture was constructed in autumn of 2011 by the Edmonton Public Art Collection at a total cost of roughly $600,000 Canadian dollars. The sculpture is named after talus, the collection of broken rock fragments at the base of a cliff or other steep rocky mass that has accumulated through periodic rockfall.

== Design ==
The sculpture consists of a hollow dome formed from several hundred spheres of polished 316L stainless steel, arranged to resemble the talus formations previously present on the site, prior to the construction of Quesnell Bridge. The spheres have been polished to a mirror sheen, resulting in the sculpture reflecting the environment around it. This gives the sculpture an ever-changing appearance depending on the time of day, season, and weather conditions. According to its creators, Ball-Nogues Studio, the piece represents the coexistence of humankind with the natural environment of the river valley. It bears many visual similarities with the studio's earlier work, Cradle.

== Controversy ==
Numerous aspects of the sculpture have been subject to controversy and disdain since its construction. Critics of the project have compared the design to a pile of marbles, a mound of rabbit droppings, human testicles, and a pile of unused construction material, while the mirror finish, in combination with its location near a major freeway, also led to concerns that it could be a dangerous distraction for drivers. The price tag also came under fire, with the Talus Dome being the most expensive public art piece in Edmonton. Due to these critiques, Edmontonian artist Ryan McCourt called the sculpture "an embarrassment to our citizens, a symbol of the Edmonton Arts Council’s continued bungling of their portfolio, and an unforgivable waste of public funds."

== Vandalism and incidents ==
- In September 2015, roughly a dozen of the steel balls were found to have been dented using an unknown steel object. Repairs cost roughly $5,000 and were completed later that month. The perpetrator has yet to be caught.
- In August 2018, an unknown vandal splashed lime paint over the dome. The paint was cleaned off the structure in the following weeks for unknown cost.
- In June 2022, an unknown vandal used aerosol paint to deface the sculpture. The paint was later cleaned off for unknown cost.
- In April 2023, a 26-year-old man named Wakeem Courtoreille was found to be stuck inside the dome, presumably having fallen through a gap after attempting to climb the sculpture. Fire crews were able to free Wakeem roughly 2 hours later, after cutting out one of the spheres to allow him to crawl through. Wakeem was later fined $5,000 for criminal mischief, in addition to damaging the statue. This particular rescue was controversial, as the structure apparently had an access hatch for maintenance purposes, meaning that cutting the statue was unnecessary.
