= D.V. Rogers =

D.V. Rogers (born 1968) is a New Zealand installation-based performance artist-engineer, best known for the machine earthwork Parkfield Interventional EQ Fieldwork (PIEQF) which took place in Parkfield, California in 2008.

Rogers works between the fields of geophysiology, cultural theory, conceptual art, resilience, performance, architecture, engineering and social commentary. He graduated from the College of fine arts (UNSW) in 1995 with a Bachelor of Fine Arts (BFA) in Media Arts. Rogers completed a Masters of Fine Arts by Research (MFA) based on the PIEQF seismic earthwork at the same institution during 2010.

== Life and work ==
Rogers was a member of the Sydney-based performance action collective Post Arrivalists (1991–95). He collaborated with machine artist-engineers Triclops International between 1996 and 2000. He began re-engineering an earthquake shake table which was presented as Seismonitor.

During 2007-08 he was artist in residence at the US Geological Survey in Menlo Park, California. In 2010, he unsuccessfully attempted to present LAMoves in Pershing Square, Los Angeles. He performed DISASTR Hotel at the University of Sydney in April 2011. "Rogers was concerned with enacting “a symbolic field test,” demonstrating how DIY structures already exist as transitional responses suitable for disaster zones."

In 2012, he was artist in residence at the Allosphere Research Facility at UC Santa Barbara, working on the Inner Earth Interpreter, an immersive auditory visualised seismic data display engine for AlloSystem. In 2013, while studying the Mercalli intensity scale, Rogers designed Moment Magnitude Scale Color Schema, used in the development of Earth Light Seat, in Newtown, New South Wales, Australia.

He collaborated with Materials & Applications, (based in Silver Lake, Los Angeles) on the 2014-15 presentation of DOMUS house, an experimental anti-seismic architecture incorporating spatialized seismic sound and light, “a contemplative space that will help people be more responsive to the larger biological and seismological environment.”
