= Tsukiji =

District of Chūō, Tokyo, Japan

Coordinates: 35°40′05″N 139°46′26″E

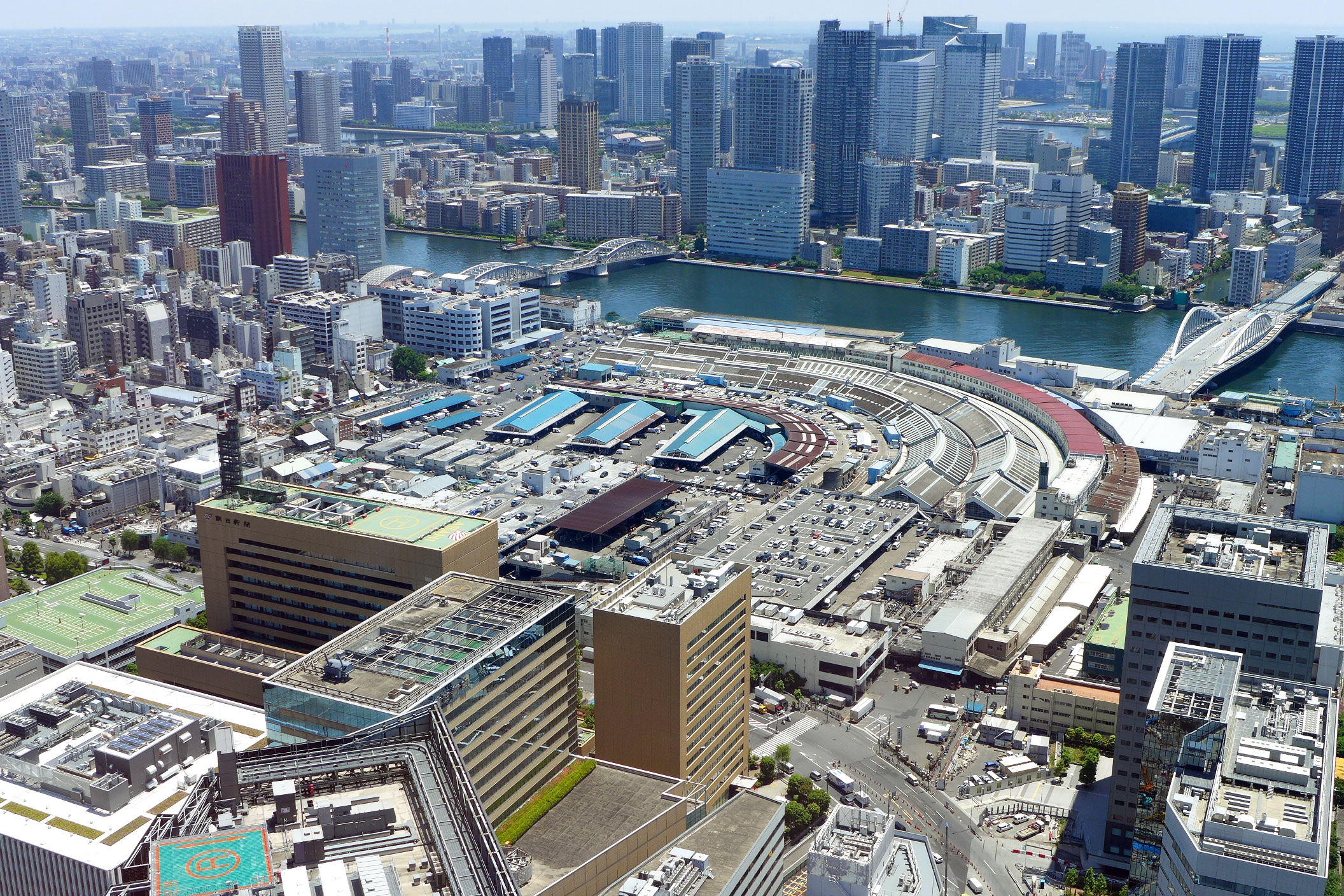
Tsukiji fish market

Tsukiji (築地) is a district of Chūō, Tokyo, Japan. Literally meaning "reclaimed land", it lies near the Sumida River on land reclaimed from Tokyo Bay in the 18th century during the Edo period. The eponymous Tsukiji fish market opened in 1935 and closed in 2018 when its operations were moved to the new Toyosu Market.

There are also districts named Tsukiji in Kobe and Amagasaki, cities in Hyōgo Prefecture, although neither is as well known as the district in Tokyo.

== History ==
Tsukiji is built on reclaimed land out of what were once lowland marshes along the Sumida River delta. Throughout the Tokugawa period, earth from the shogunate's extensive moat and canal excavations was systematically used to fill in the marshes along the river, creating new commercial districts and waterfront housing. The land was then named Tsukiji (築地), meaning "constructed land" or "reclaimed land".

The Great Fire of Meireki of 1657 destroyed over two-thirds of Edo's buildings, including Hongan-ji temple in Asakusa, the enormous Kantō headquarters of the Jōdo Shinshū sect. As a result, the temple site was relocated to Tsukiji, where many of the residents of nearby Tsukudajima were instrumental in its reconstruction. A number of other temples were also erected on what is now the outer marketplace. In addition, many private residences for samurai and feudal lords were constructed along the southern edge of Tsukiji.

In 1869, Tsukiji was designated as an approved residential area for foreigners and treaty port. However, as the Yokohama foreign settlement, opened in 1859, had already become a center for commercial activities and international trade it never flourished, Like Yokohama, it was separated from the city by a canal.Tsukiji grew more as a focus for education, healthcare and Christian mission work. Early classroom and study facilities for Keio University, Rikkyo University, Aoyama Gakkuin, St. Margaret's Junior College, the American School in Japan and St. Luke's International Hospital were all to be found in this district. The Hoterukan (also known as Tsukiji Hotel or Edo Hotel), the first foreign -style hotel in Tokyo was a popular subject for woodblock prints after it opened in 1870, but it burned down after only four years.It was never very popular with foreigners, who gravitated to other parts of the city or Yokohama. Moreover, the roadstead was distant because the harbor was shallow. After twenty years (1889), it was reincorporated into the city of Tokyo.

The United States legation occupied a site in Tsukiji from 1875 to 1890 on the site that is now occupied by the St. Luke's Garden complex. The American legation had been moved from an old temple in Azabu, by Minister John Bingham, prominent Reconstruction era Ohio congressman and the longest serving American chief of mission to serve in Japan. A total of ten other legations also established quarters there.

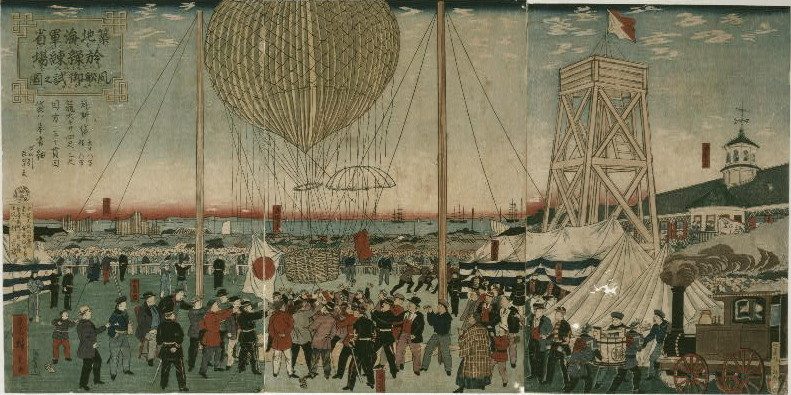
Tsukiji Naval Academy hot air balloon demonstration (1877) Hiroshige III

Tsukiji was also the location from 1869 of the Imperial Japanese Navy technical training facilities, renamed in 1876 as the Imperial Japanese Naval Academy. In 1888, the Naval Academy was relocated from Tsukiji to new, larger facilities at Etajima in Hiroshima Prefecture. The Tsukiji naval buildings next to the Akibashi bridge then became home, until 1923, of the Naval War College, a post-graduate staff college for senior naval officers.

After it was closed as a treaty port, it became an industrial area. The Great Kantō earthquake on September 1, 1923, and the resultant fires which raged in its aftermath, caused severe damage throughout central Tokyo. A significant portion of the Tsukiji district burned to the ground, and the old Nihonbashi fish market was razed. In the citywide restructuring following the quake, the Nihonbashi fish market was relocated to the Tsukiji district, and after the construction of a modern market facility, reopened in 1935. It was a major source of fish for the region. In his book on Tsukiji, Theodore Bestor called it "the market at the center of the world."

== Places of interest ==
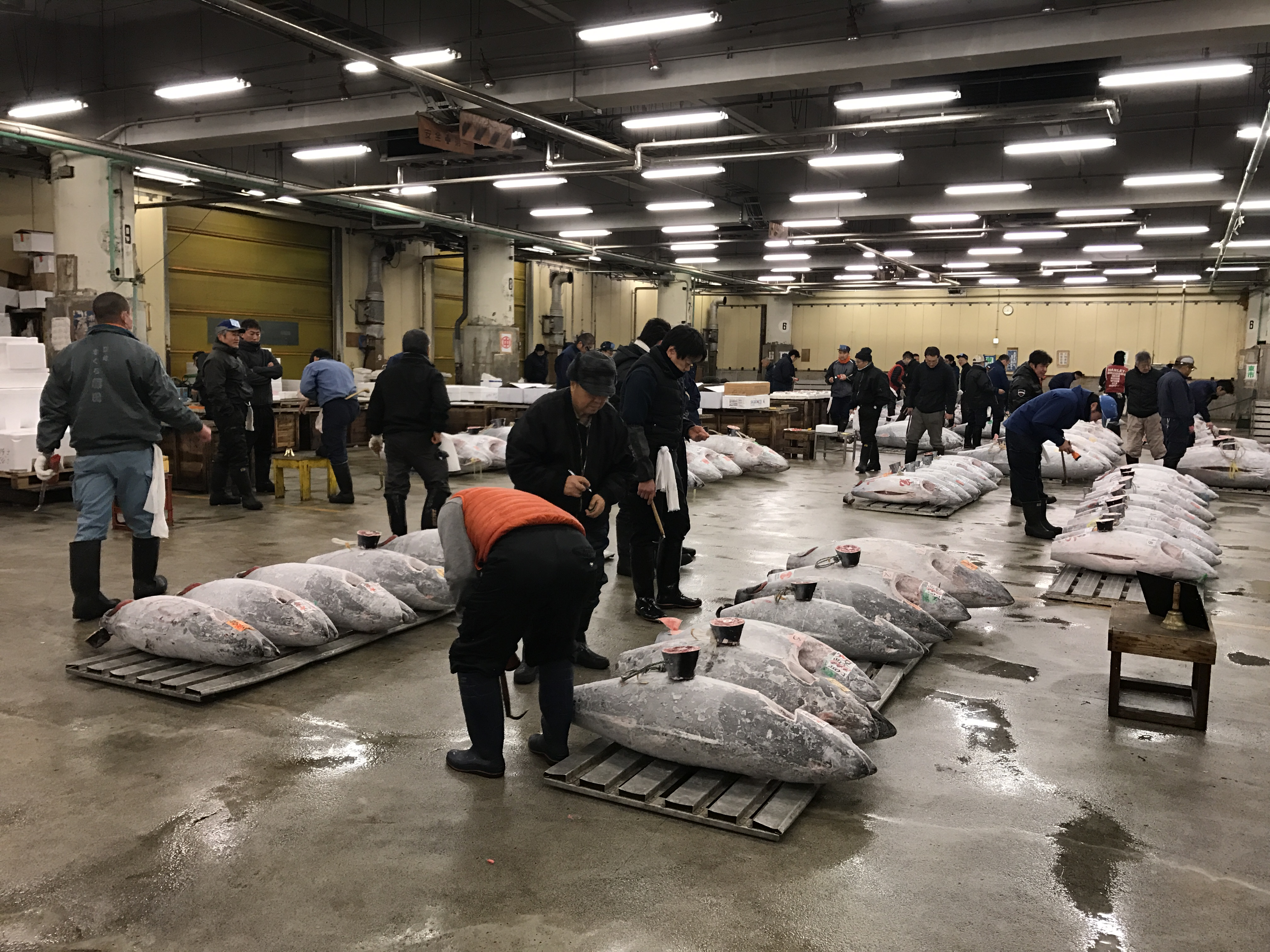
Auction in Tsukiji fish market (2017)

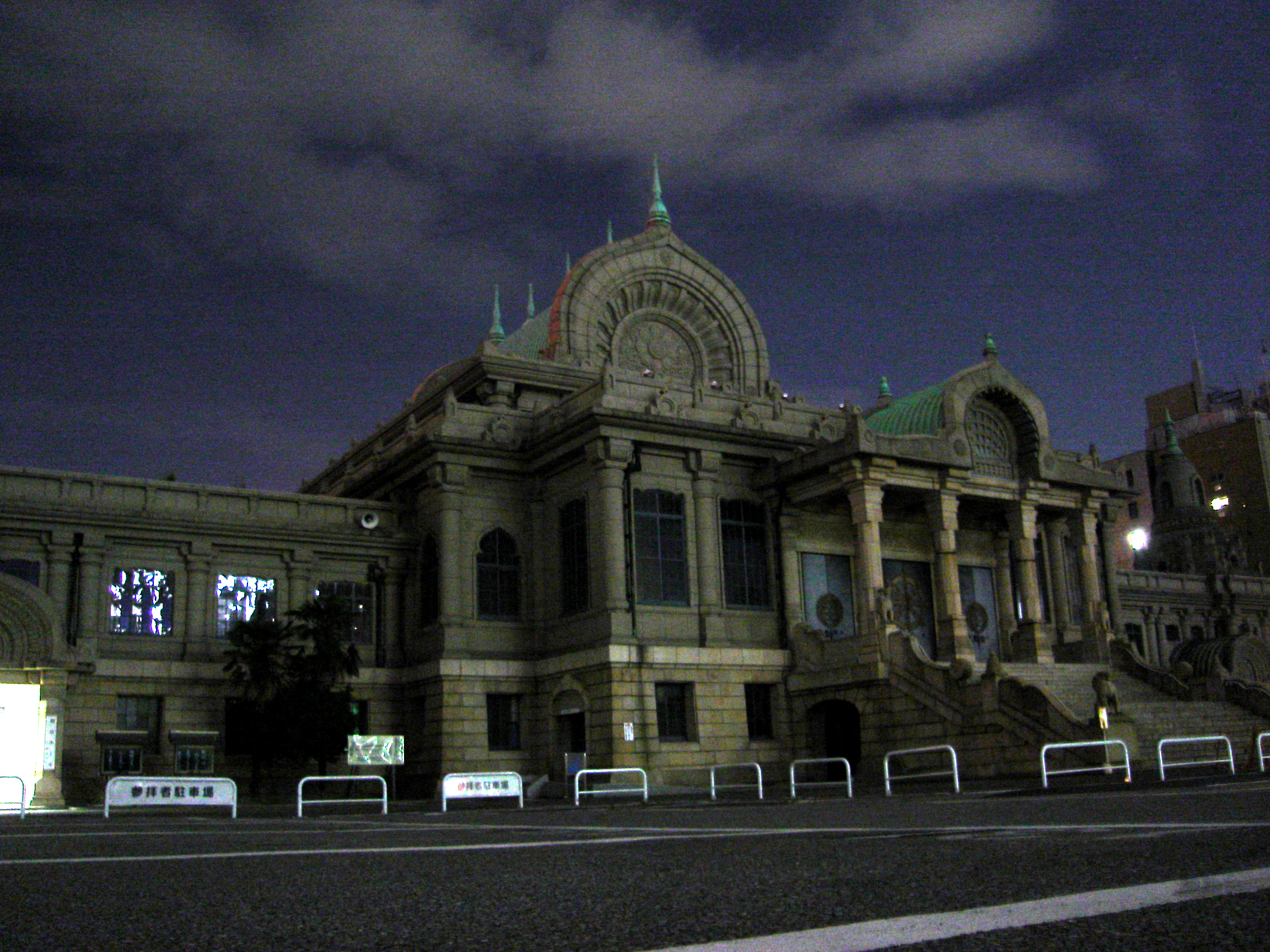
Tsukiji Hongan-ji

- For many residents and visitors to Tokyo, the Central Wholesale Market, better known as the Tsukiji fish market was synonymous with sushi, sashimi and seafood products of every kind. While the inner market moved in October 2018 to the new Toyosu Market, the many small neighborhood restaurants, restaurant supply stores and retail operations in the outer market have remained and act as a major culinary tourist destination. Tsukiji was the largest fish market in the world handling more than 2000 tons of 450 types of seafood daily.
- Tsukiji Hongan-ji, a key temple of the Jōdo Shinshū sect of Buddhism. Inside the temple is a small memorial to deceased popular rock star hide.
- The Sumida River, the Tsukiji riverbank has pedestrian access north of the Kachidoki Bridge.
- Quieter backstreets of Tsukiji still feature some older properties and storefronts clad in copper tiles used in the early Showa Period as a means of weather-proofing and distinctive architectural decoration.
- St. Luke's Garden, one of Tokyo's taller buildings containing, offices, a hotel, residential and long-term care accommodation. Part of the St. Luke's International Hospital campus.

== Gallery ==
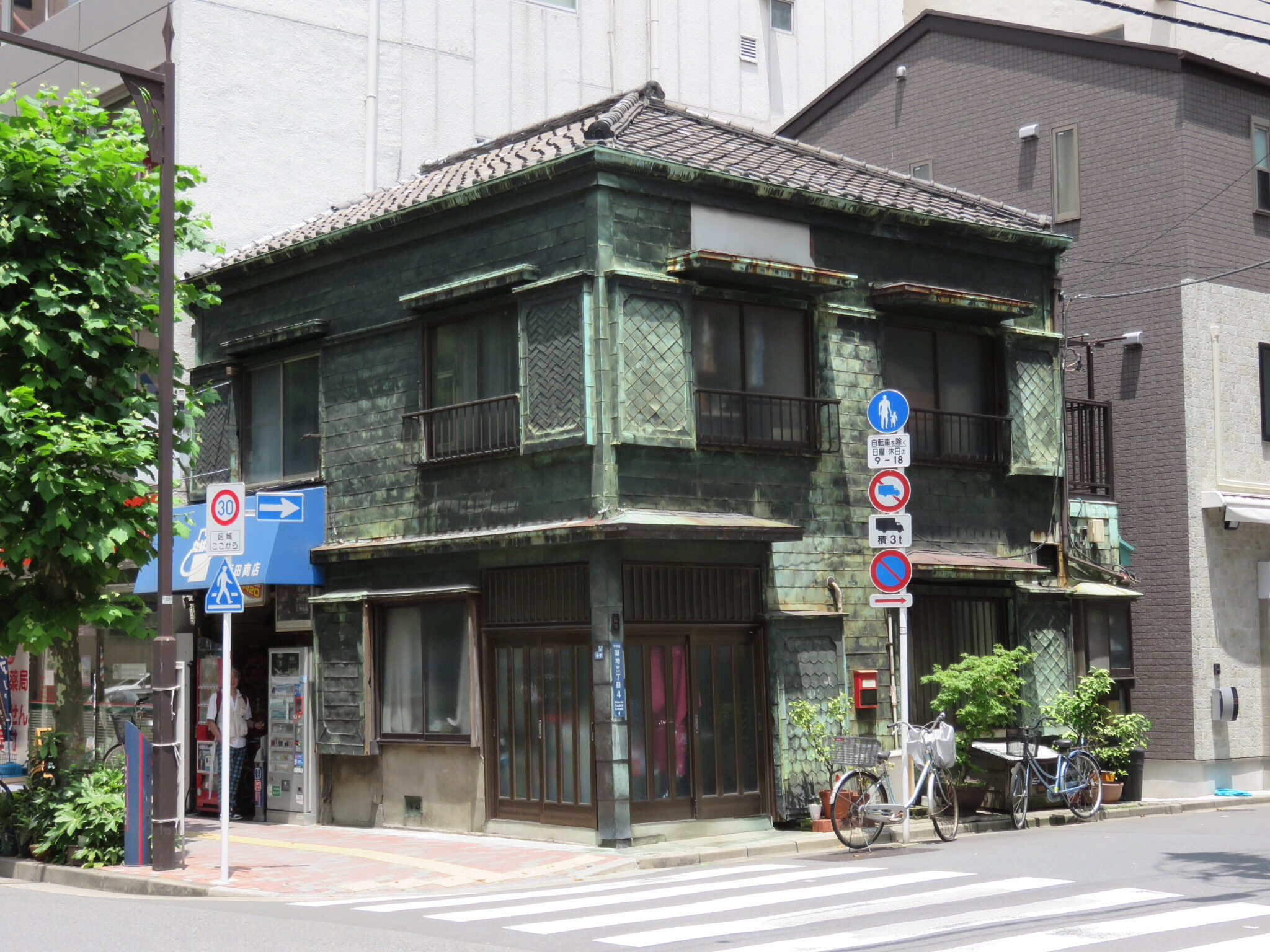
Tsukiji Storefront with copper wall cladding

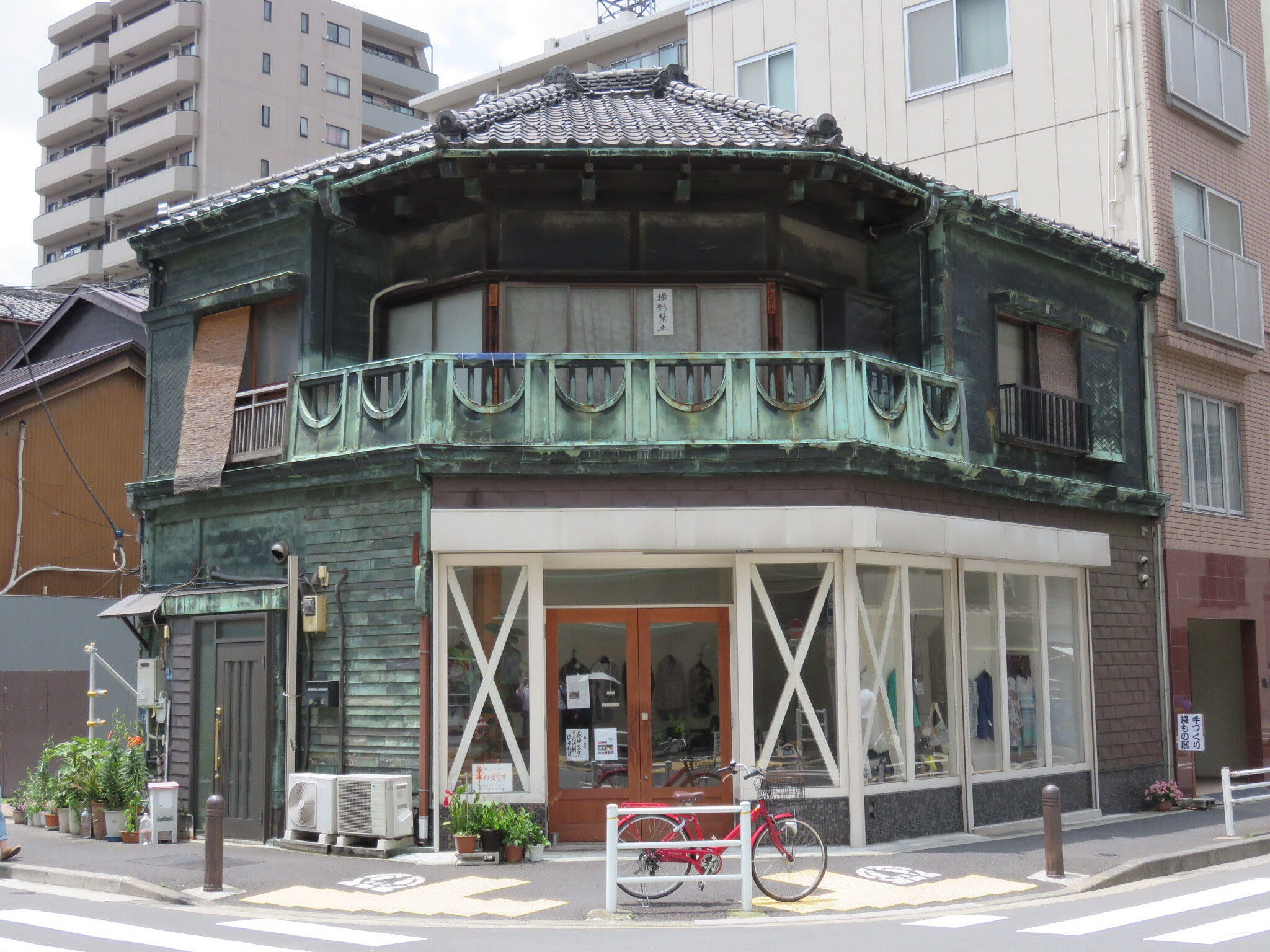
Tsukiji Storefront with copper wall and balcony cladding

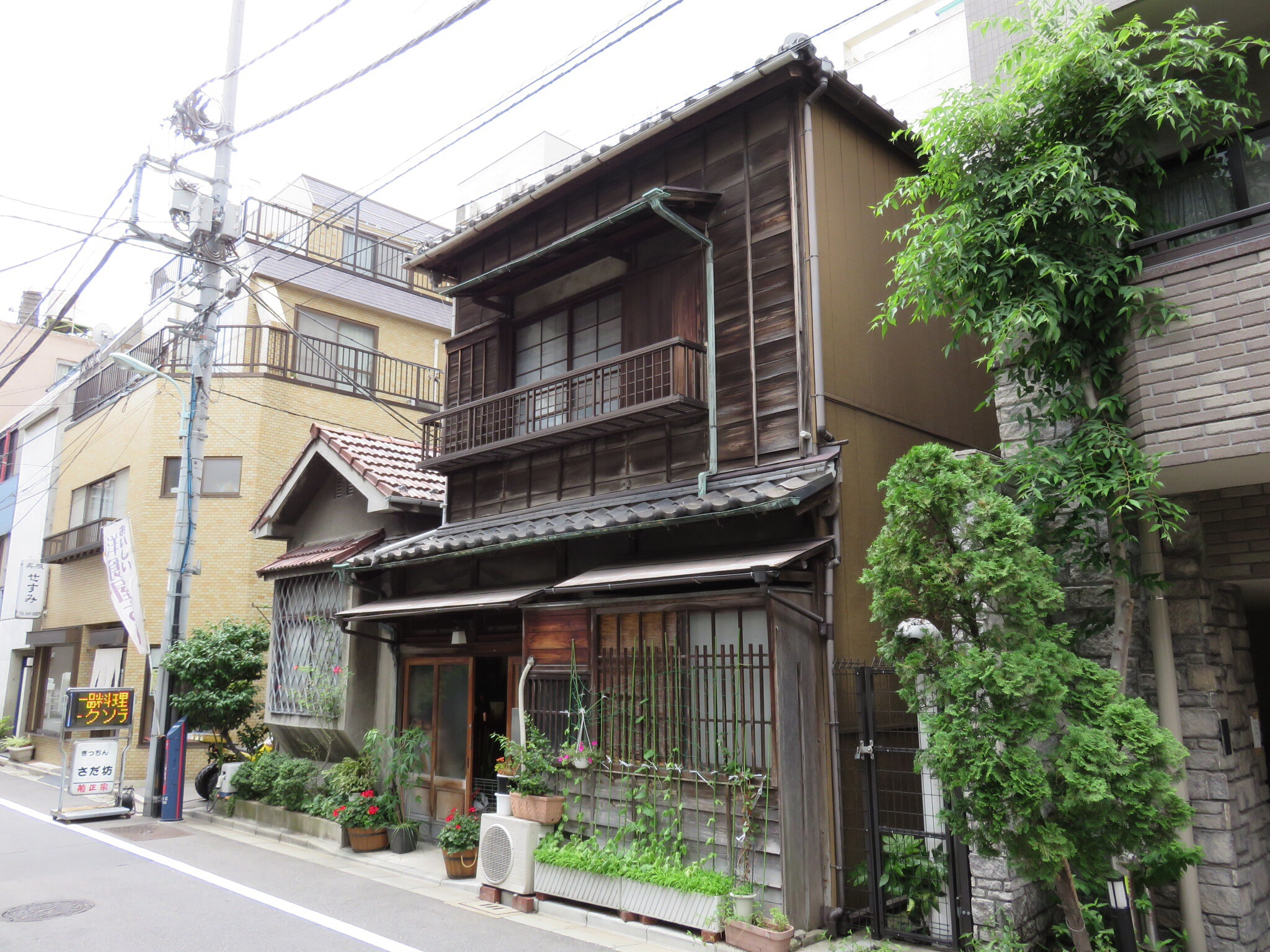
Tsukiji back street

== Companies based in Tsukiji ==
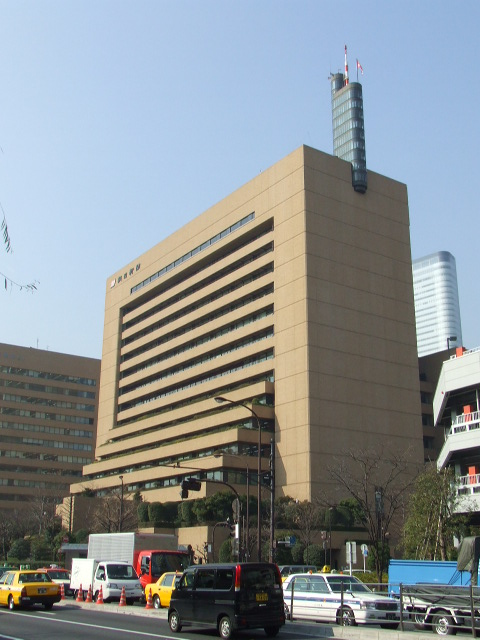
Asahi Shimbun headquarters in Tsukiji

- Asahi Shimbun
- Mitsui E＆S
- Nihon Ad Systems
- NTT Data
- Shochiku

Foreign companies with offices:

- Avianca

== Subway stations ==
- Tsukijishijō Station on Toei Ōedo Line
- Tsukiji Station on Tokyo Metro Hibiya Line
- Shintomicho Station on Tokyo Metro Yurakucho Line
- Walking distance from Shinbashi and Ginza

== Education ==
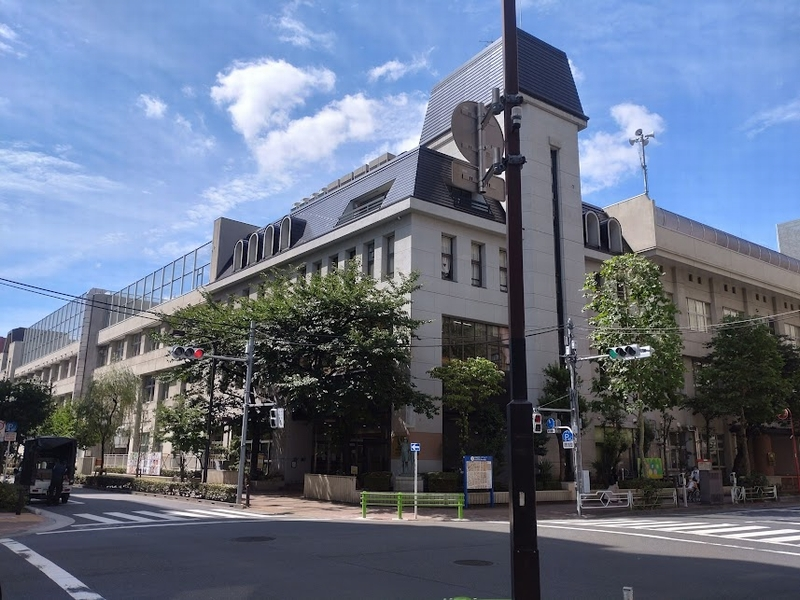
Kyobashi Tsukiji Elementary School (中央区立京橋築地小学校)

Public elementary and junior high schools are operated by Chuo City Board of Education. Tsukiji 1-6 chome are zoned to Kyōbashi Tsukiji Elementary School (中央区立京橋築地小学校), while Tsukiji 7-chome is zoned to Akashi Elementary School (中央区立明石小学校). All of Tsukiji is zoned to Ginza Junior High School (中央区立銀座中学校)

Rikkyo Junior High School, a private secondary school, was established in Tsukiji in 1896 but the building was destroyed by the Great Kanto earthquake, so a new building in Ikebukuro opened in 1923.
