= Jimenez Lai =

American architect

- Occupation: Architect

Jimenez Lai is a faculty member at the USC School of Architecture in Los Angeles. He is also the founder and leader of Bureau Spectacular, a design studio founded in 2008 and led by Jimenez Lai.

== Academic career ==
Jimenez Lai is a faculty member at the USC School of Architecture in Los Angeles and was previously a faculty member at UCLA. Lai previously held the LeFevre Fellowship at the Knowlton School of Architecture at the Ohio State University in 2007 and the Howarth-Wright Fellowship at Taliesin (studio)/Taliesin West. He was an assistant professor at University of Illinois at Chicago.

== Published works ==
- "Primitives". Log/Issue 22.
- "On Types of Seductive Robustness". Candide / Issue 3.
- "Obstruction: A New Healthy Body". Pidgin / Issue 9.
- "The Future Archaeologist". PLOT / Issue 1
- "Plan v Section". Conditions / Issue 5+6
- "The Future Archaeologist". Beyond Magazine / Issue 3
- "Big Box Robotz". Journal of American Institute of Architecture Students / Spring 2010
- "Laundry Man". Conditions / Issue 3
- "Point Clouds". MAS Context / Issue 4
- "Vertical Urbanism". 306090 / Issue 12

Jimenez Lai's monograph, Citizens of no place : an architectural graphic novel supported by the Graham Foundation for Advanced Studies in the Fine Arts and Princeton Architectural Press.

== Built Work ==
- Tower of Twelve Stories Installation / Coachella Valley Music Festival / Coachella, CA. 2016
- White Elephant (Privately Soft) Installation / Land of Tomorrow (LoT) / Louisville, KY. 2011
- The Briefcase House Super Furniture / Chicago, IL. 2010.
- Point Clouds Installation / Extension Gallery / Chicago, IL. 2009.
- Phalanstery Module Installation / Materials & Applications / Los Angeles, CA. 2008

== Videos ==
- Point Clouds Installation in Extension Gallery, 2009. Supported by the Graham Foundation for Advanced Studies in the Fine Arts.
- Phalanstery Module for Materials & Applications 2008.
- Jimenez Lai at Pecha Kucha 2010.
