= David Lee (real estate developer) =

American real estate developer

David Y. Lee
- Born: c.1955
- Education: Northwestern University
- Occupations: Physician, real estate investor
- Spouse: Miki M. Nam

David Y. Lee is an American real estate developer known for holdings in Los Angeles.

== Early life ==
David Y. Lee was born c.1955. He graduated from Northwestern University, where he received a medical degree.

== Career ==
Lee began investing in properties after the 1992 Los Angeles riots. He acquired the California Mart from investor Judah Hertz for US$135 million in 2004-2005.

His company, Jamison Properties, has a portfolio valued at $3 billion in 2008 and includes Banco Popular Center, MCI Center and Macy's Plaza in downtown LA. Much of his portfolio is concentrated in properties on Wilshire Boulevard. In 2013, Jamison sold the former Macy's Plaza multi-use complex for $241 million to The Ratkovich Company.

On Feb. 23, 2018, at a meeting with Los Angeles City Council President Herb Wesson and a community advocacy group that had campaigned against his project at 3700 Wilshire Boulevard, Dr. Lee reportedly said he would use his AR-15 rifle to shoot people who step on his land. Dr. David Lee later apologized for his remarks.

Following the Los Angeles City Council’s vote to make 3700 Wilshire Boulevard a Historic-Cultural Monument, preserving the building and the park, Jamison Properties agreed to preserve the disputed open space. Garrett Lee, president of Jamison Properties and Dr. Lee’s son, said the company respected the city’s decision and would preserve the open space. He said the company was proud to be a part of Koreatown and wanted to work with the community “for the betterment of our neighborhood.”

== Philanthropy ==
Lee is on the board of directors of the Korean American Museum. He has made charitable contributions to the UCLA School of Dentistry.

== Personal life ==
Lee is married to Miki M. Nam, a dentist. Dr. Lee has four children. Three of his children work for Jamison Realty, the company he founded. His daughter, Jaime Lee, is CEO of Jamison, his son Garrett leads the residential development company, and Phil runs the commercial property management.
