= Materials & Applications =

American art exhibition space

Coordinates: 34.06629°N 118.23571°W

Materials and Applications
- Formation: 2002
- Founder: Jenna Didler
- Founded at: Silver Lake, California
- Purpose: To pursue a public, participatory, and just culture of experimentation in architecture.
- Headquarters: 970 N. Broadway; Chinatown, Los Angeles, California
- Director: Kate Yeh Chiu (architect)
- Website: https://www.materialsandapplications.org/

Materials & Applications is a Los Angeles–based art and architecture exhibition space. M&A's exhibitions typically take the form of outdoor, public installations, and one-to-one architecture. The organization is one of dozens of small non-profit artist run spaces that have been called "feral" in their relationship to larger, more established organizations and museums in Los Angeles. Jeremy Rosenberg, a Los Angeles-based writer, has likened it to other "feral" artist-run organizations such as The Museum of Jurassic Technology, Center for Land Use Interpretation, and Echo Park Film Center.

== Overview ==
Materials & Applications is a non-profit organization dedicated to bringing new ideas in art and architecture into public space and public dialogue. The organization is currently directed by architect Kate Yeh Chiu, preceded by Jia Gu.

The organization was founded in 2002 by artist Jenna Didier, in the front yard of her Silver Lake home and studio. Oliver Hess met Didier in 2004 and joined her as Technical Director of Materials & Applications in 2005 – later become co-director before leaving the organization in 2012 From 2015 to 2020, Jia Y. Gu served as director and curator. The current director of M&A is Kate Yeh Chiu. As Amelie Taylor-Hochbert reports in Archinect: "Didier started the driveway-sized venue in the front yard of her Silver Lake home in the early 2000s, looking for a space to establish community and exchange for like-minded architects, artists, designers, and makers in the city."

In 2018, Materials & Applications moved out of its Silver Lake home and relocated its offices to Chinatown. In lieu of their permanent exhibition space, Materials & Applications has expanded their programming into various neighborhoods throughout the Los Angeles area with temporary projects and multi-sited exhibitions. Currently, Materials & Applications activates a storefront exhibition space on Sunset Boulevard in Echo Park and since 2020 activates the courtyard at the Craft Contemporary as part of a multi-year residency. These exhibitions are free to the public.

Materials & Applications past artists include Benjamin Ball, Layers LA: Emily White and Lisa Little, Judy Chicago, Gail Borden, Rob Ley, D.V. Rogers, Doris Sung, Jimenez Lai, Marcelo Spina, and Warren Techentin. The organization's work has been exhibited in shows at the Cal State Long Beach University Art Museum and in the San Francisco Museum of Craft and Design. It is run by a board of directors with a young leadership council called the Contemporary Council. The organization has received funding by the Pasadena Arts Alliance, Andy Warhol Foundation, Metabolic Studio, Department of Cultural Affairs, LA County Arts Commission and the Graham Foundation.

== Programs ==
The organization organizes public programs or hands-on building activities for the local community and participating artists. Past programs include Zoning & Its Applications, Can A Building Own Itself?, New Forensics: Scenarios and Simulated Environments, and Staging Construction, an open call for projects. Past installations include a golden vortex (Maximilian's Shell), a mini-golf course (TURF: A Mini-Gold Project), an igloo (Light Frames), a dissolving ice performance, a rotating room (Phalunstary Module) and a large white bird-cage (Le Cage aux Folles).

A key aspect of their work is to allow artists and architects to test new ideas and new construction methods. "Places like M&A provide architects with the opportunity to fail. I mean that in the best possible way," said Benjamin Ball of Ball-Nogues, whose works are now in the collections of the Museum of Modern Art and the Los Angeles County Museum of Art. "Not many clients will support a trial-and-error process on an untested structure. M&A is a place where you can do that."

Uncube Magazine called it "part architecture gallery, part public art display, and part workshop for experimentation and learning, the venue provides an outdoor exhibition space for new architectural ideas, while inviting the public to participate in creating its installations."
