= California Mart =

Commercial complex in Los Angeles, California, United States

Coordinates: 34.040532°N 118.255427°W

- Interactive map of the California Mart area

General information
- Type: Commercial
- Location: Los Angeles, California
- Completed: 1963; 1965; 1979
- Owner: David Lee

Technical details
- Floor count: 13

Design and construction
- Architect: Norma Merrick Sklarek

The California Mart, also known as California Market Center, are three high-rise buildings in Los Angeles, California, USA.

== Location ==
The buildings are located in the Fashion District of Downtown Los Angeles. The main entrance is on Olympic Boulevard, between Main Street and Los Angeles Street.

== History ==
The California Mart was built for Harvey and Barney Morse, two brothers from New York City who started a clothing factory in Downtown Los Angeles in the early 1960s.

The three 13-story buildings were designed in the modernist architectural style.

The first building, located at the intersection of 9th Street and South Los Angeles Street, was completed in 1963. It is 13-story high. The second building, located on South Main Street, was completed in 1965. The third building, located on Olympic Boulevard and Main Street, was completed in 1979.

The buildings were owned by the Morse family until 1994, when it was foreclosed and acquired by the Equitable Life Assurance Co. They were listed for sale in 2000, and they were acquired by the Hertz Investment Group, chaired by Judah Hertz. In 2004–2005, the building complex was sold to the Jamison Group, owned by investor David Lee, for US$135 million. Brookfield purchased controlling interest from Jamison in 2017, for $440 million. In November 2018, Brookfield unveiled renderings for a $170 million overhaul of the property.
