= Parkfield Interventional EQ Fieldwork =

Coordinates: 35°53′58″N 120°26′1″W

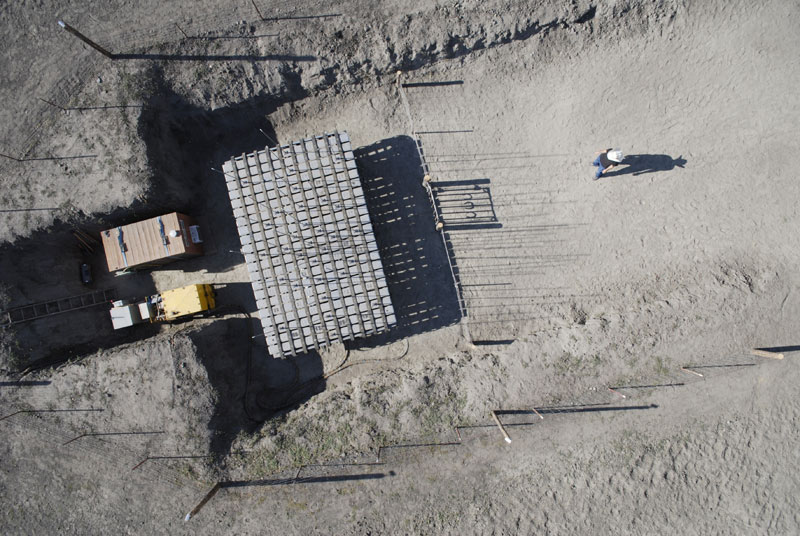
PIEQF - Kite Aerial Photography by Scott Haefner USGS

The Parkfield Interventional EQ Fieldwork also known as PIEQF can be seen as the seminal work of New Zealand born installation and performance artist D.V. Rogers.

This early 21st century example of land art was installed temporarily in the remote township of Parkfield, Central California. A geologically interactive installation, this machine earthwork operated autonomously for a total of 91 days between 18 August and 16 November 2008.

An earthquake shaking table was used in this seismic art intervention which was controlled by realtime reported Californian earthquakes detected by the US Geological Survey seismic monitoring network.

== Construction ==
Rogers selected the location of Parkfield for its significance as the most densely monitored earthquake region in the world. USGS Seismologist Andy Micheal originally suggested the location. Parkfield is also the home of the USGS Parkfield Earthquake Experiment and the San Andreas Fault Observatory at Depth (SAFOD). The region of Parkfield is located on the central section of the San Andreas Fault.

The work consisted of installing a re-engineered earthquake shake table in a crudely excavated trench in a vacant field between the Parkfield Cafe and Parkfield CAL FIRE Station. Local contractors Frank Parlot and John Jamrog used a bulldozer and excavator to displace 125 cubic yards of earth on 9 June 2008 from the site.

Rogers originally intended to have the installation operational between 28 June and 28 September. Extreme hot weather, natural dust devils, software development and financial constraints pushed the system switch on date to 18 August 2008.

Software for the installation was developed by Dr. Geo Homsy (US), Stock Plum (NL), Mr. Snow (NZ), Andy Michael (USGS) and Peter Luka (US).

The installation was two years in planning, culminating in 77 days of assembly, and resulted in 91 days of continuous seismic data connectivity. The seismic interface control system was shut down on 16 November 2008. Eight days later the shake table was removed from site. Rogers and local landowner John Varian filled in the excavated trench and repatriated the site.

== Performance ==
The Parkfield Interventional EQ Fieldwork was triggered by almost 4500 Californian seismic events. Individual event IDS were allocated and have been archived by USGS databases. 43000 webcam frames were disseminated live via the internet. 7,862,400 seconds (91 days) of analogue VCR video recording was collected.

The installation was extensively documented by filmmaker Christina McPhee along with a series of photographs with kite aerial photography produced by geologist and photographer Scott Haefner.

Influenced by the monumental and permanent land art earthworks of the early 1970s, the installation was a conceptual feedback loop between the seismic activity of California and the mechanical reflection of these frequent seismic events which controlled the earthquake shake table. Each time an earthquake occurred an array of 5/8 inch steel rods attached to the earthquake shake table oscillated and resonated.

Today in Parkfield there is very little evidence to suggest that this earthwork actually took place.
