= Pacific Design Center =

Multi-use facility in California, US

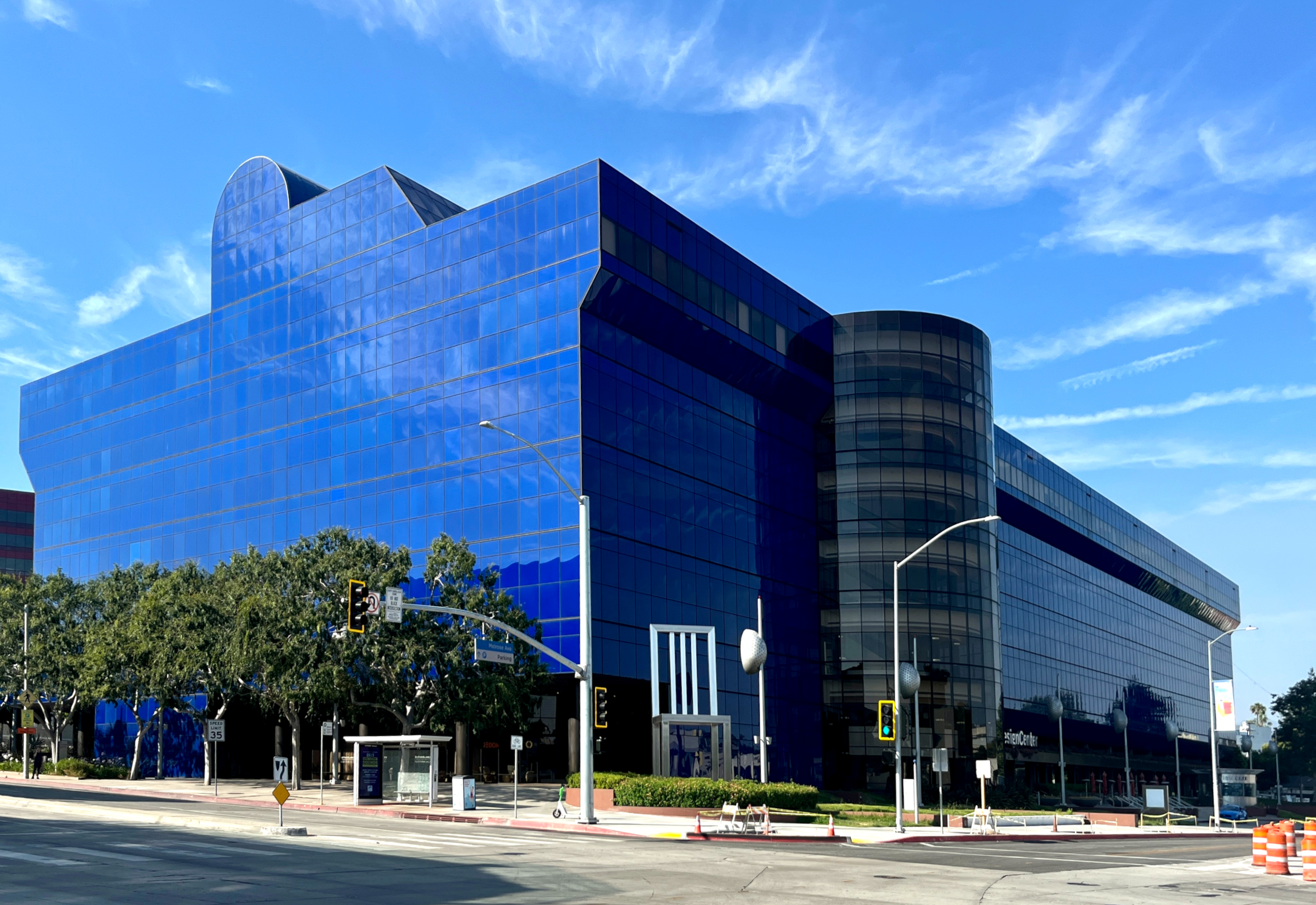
- Pacific Design Center, Center Blue aka The Blue Whale
- Interactive map of the Pacific Design Center area

General information
- Location: 8687 Melrose Ave, West Hollywood, California, United States
- Coordinates: 34.08232°N 118.38238°W
- Completed: 1975
- Client: Charles S. Cohen
- Owner: Cohen Brothers Realty Corporation

Design and construction
- Architect: César Pelli

The Pacific Design Center, or PDC, is a 1,600,000-square-foot (150,000 m^{2}) multi-use facility for the design community in West Hollywood, California. One of the buildings is often described as the Blue Whale because of its large size relative to surrounding buildings and its brilliant blue glass cladding.

== Description ==
The PDC houses the West Coast's top decorating and furniture market, with showrooms, public and private spaces and used to host a branch of the Museum of Contemporary Art (MOCA). The Center has 100 showrooms which display and sell 2,200 interior product lines to professional interior designers, architects, facility managers, decorators and dealers.

The Pacific Design Center hosts many screenings, exhibitions, lectures, meetings, special events and receptions for the design, entertainment and arts communities. The annual Elton John AIDS Foundation Academy Award Party has traditionally been held at the PDC. The party is one of the longest running and best known of the post-Oscar parties as well as being a multimillion-dollar fundraiser for the foundation.

The interior of one floor of the Blue Whale, and the escalators of the same building, are used extensively as the underground workshops for the Westworld TV series.

== Architecture ==
Designed by Argentine architect César Pelli, the 14-acre (57,000 m^{2}) campus opened in 1975, with the 750,000-square-foot (70,000 m^{2}) Center Blue. Architect Norma Merrick Sklarek also contributed to the architectural design of the building. Center Green opened in 1988, adding 450,000 square feet (42,000 m^{2}). The final phase of the plan, Center Red, opened in 2013 with an additional 400,000 square feet (37,000 m^{2}).

== Gallery ==
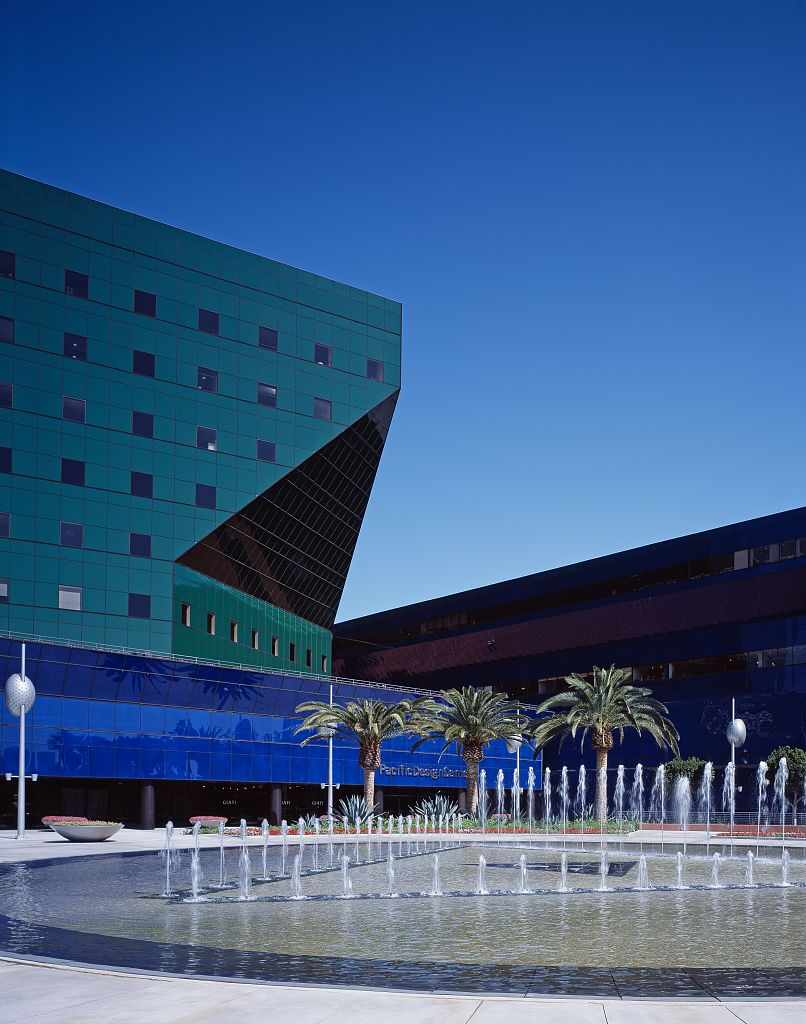
Center Green and the central fountain at the Pacific Design Center

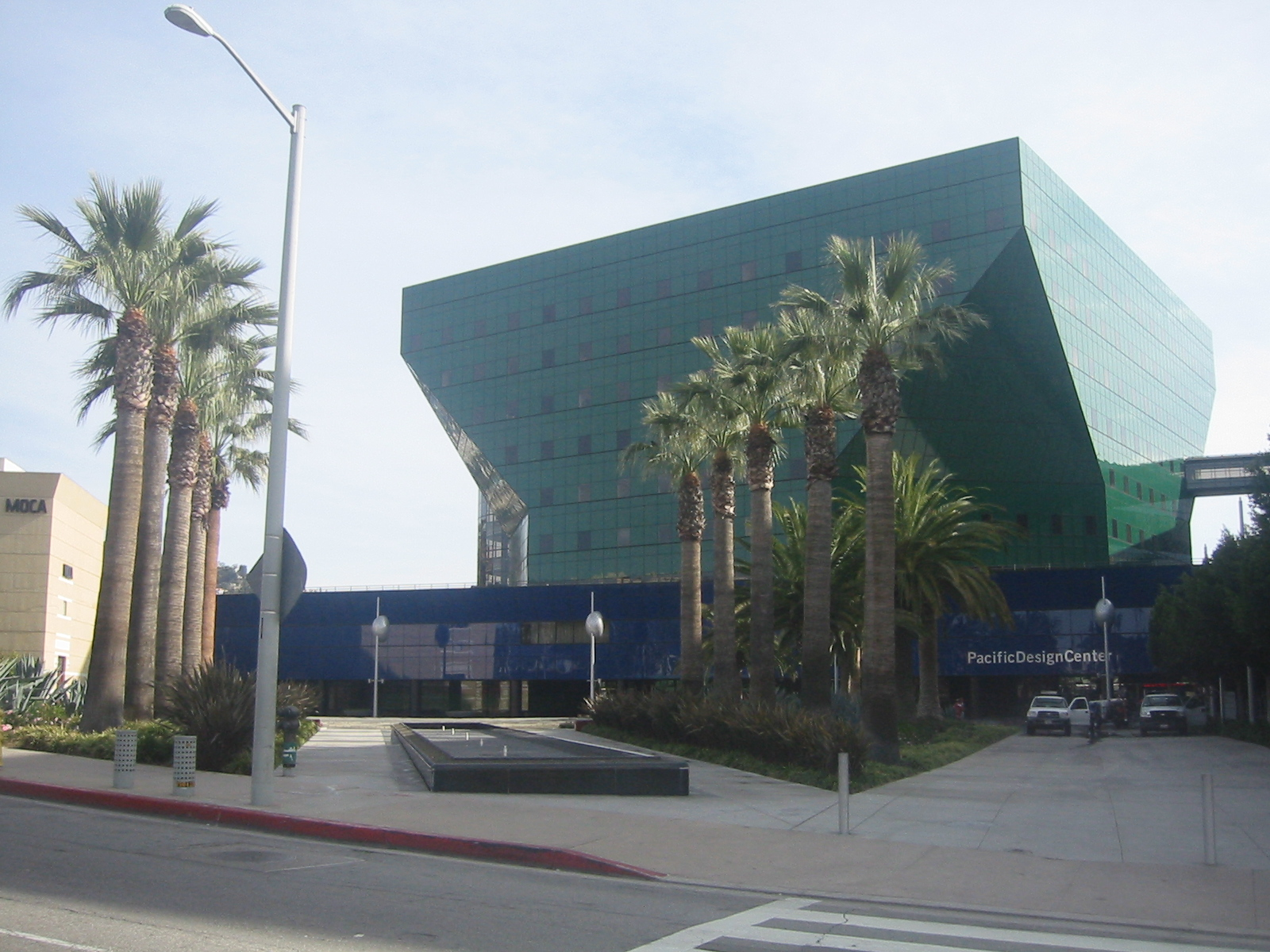
Pacific Design Center Center Green

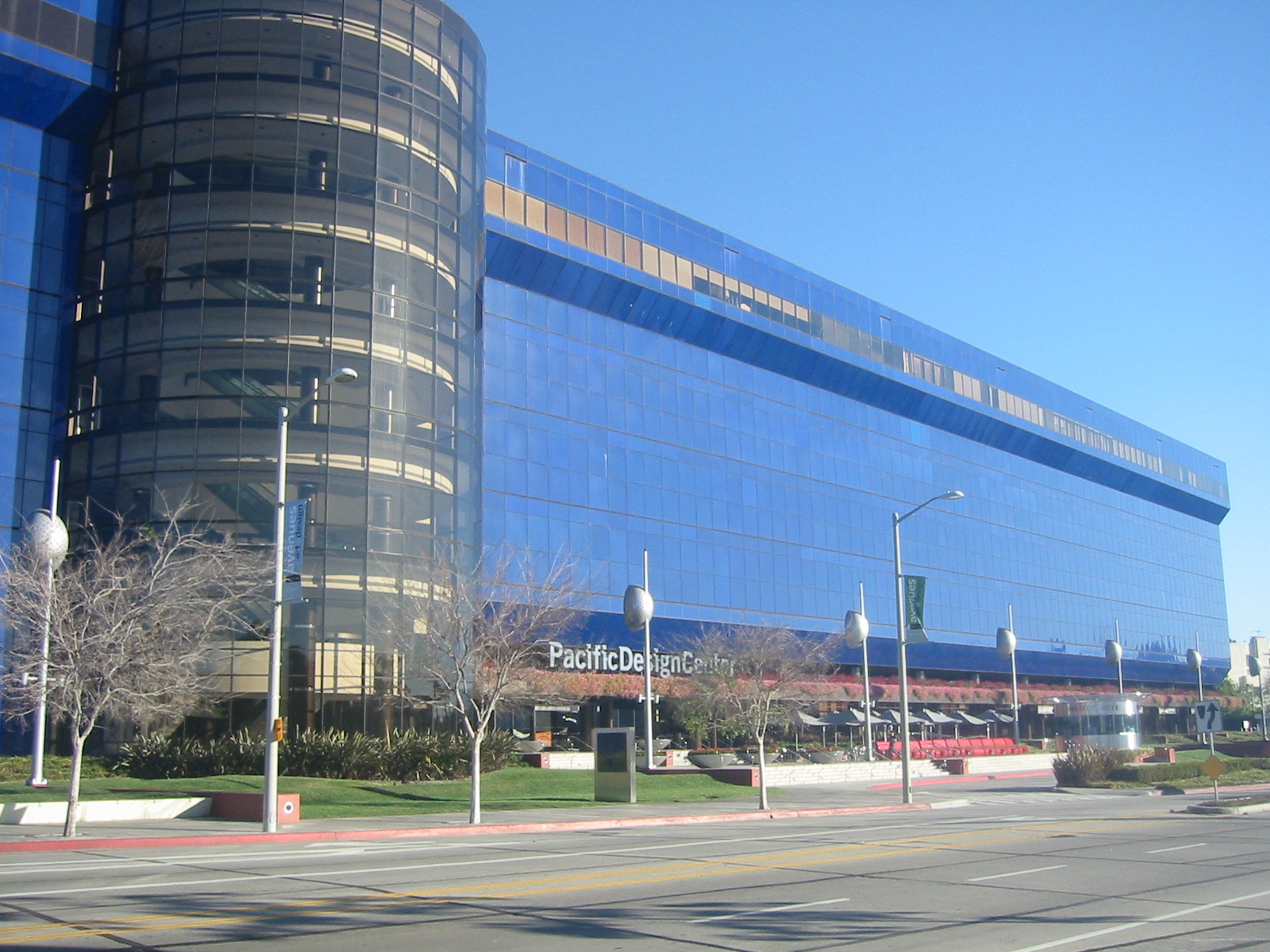
Pacific Design Center Center Blue or "The Blue Whale"

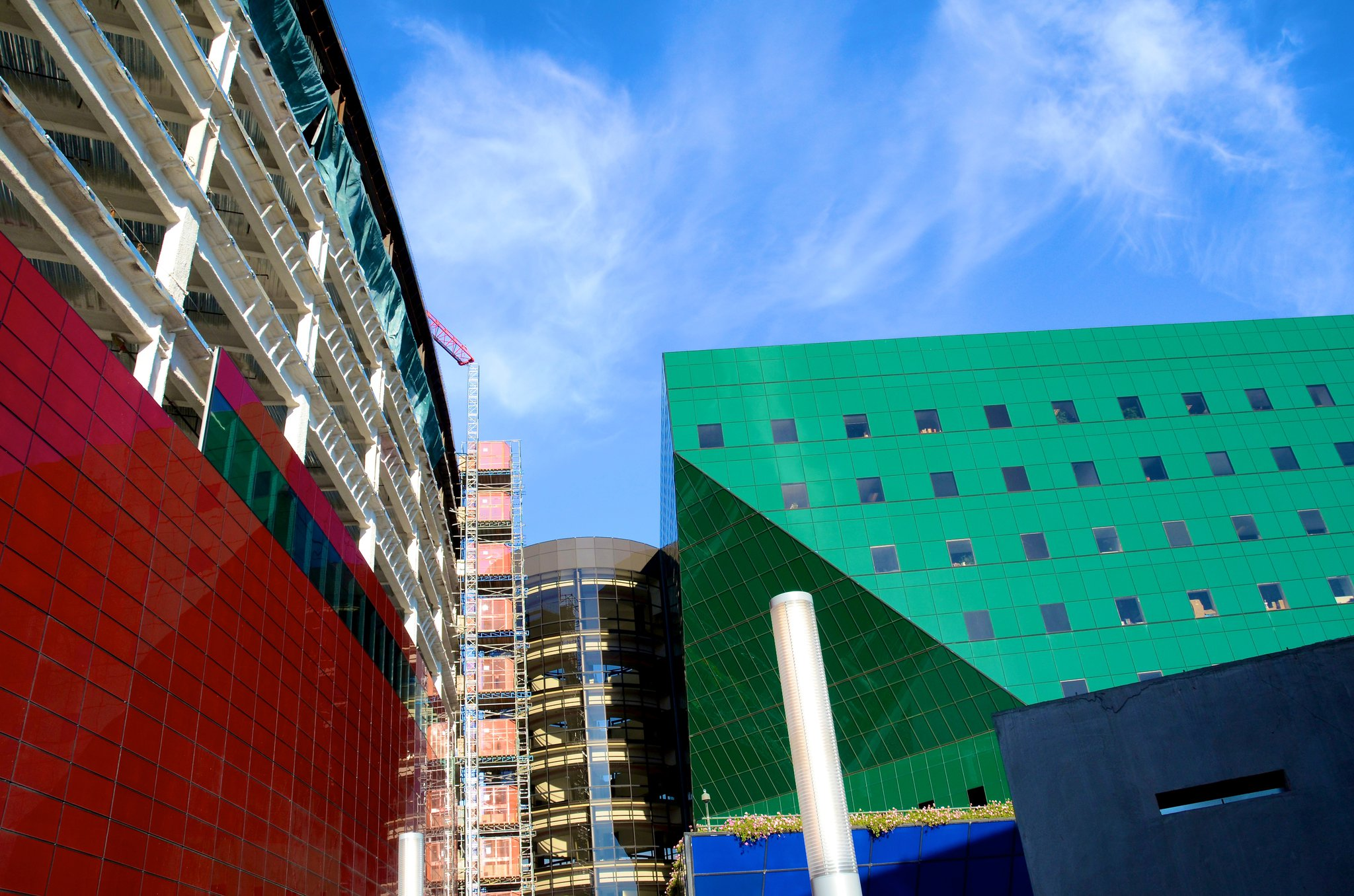
Pacific Design Center - Red Building nearing completion, Feb. 28, 2011

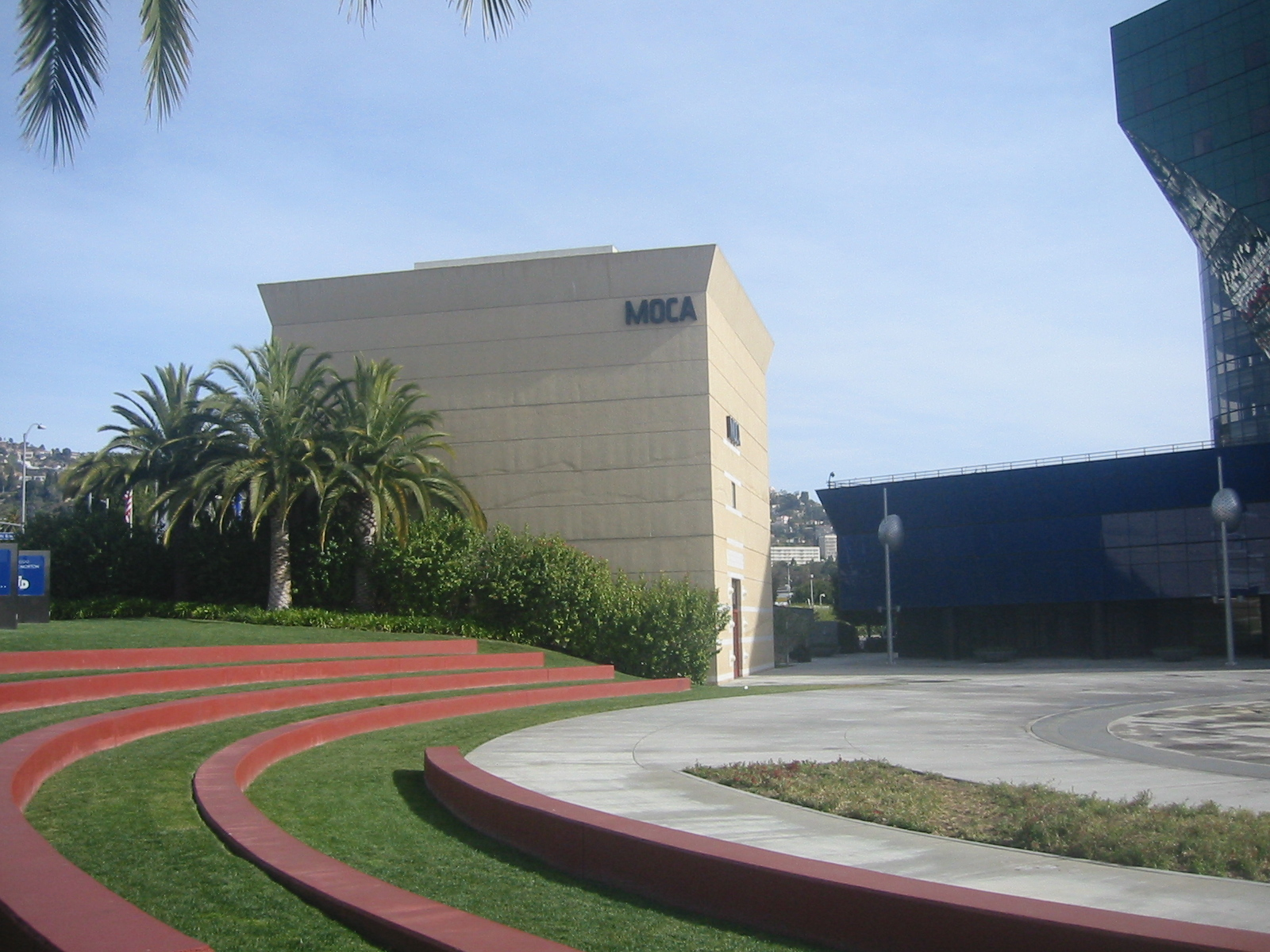
MOCA at the Pacific Design Center

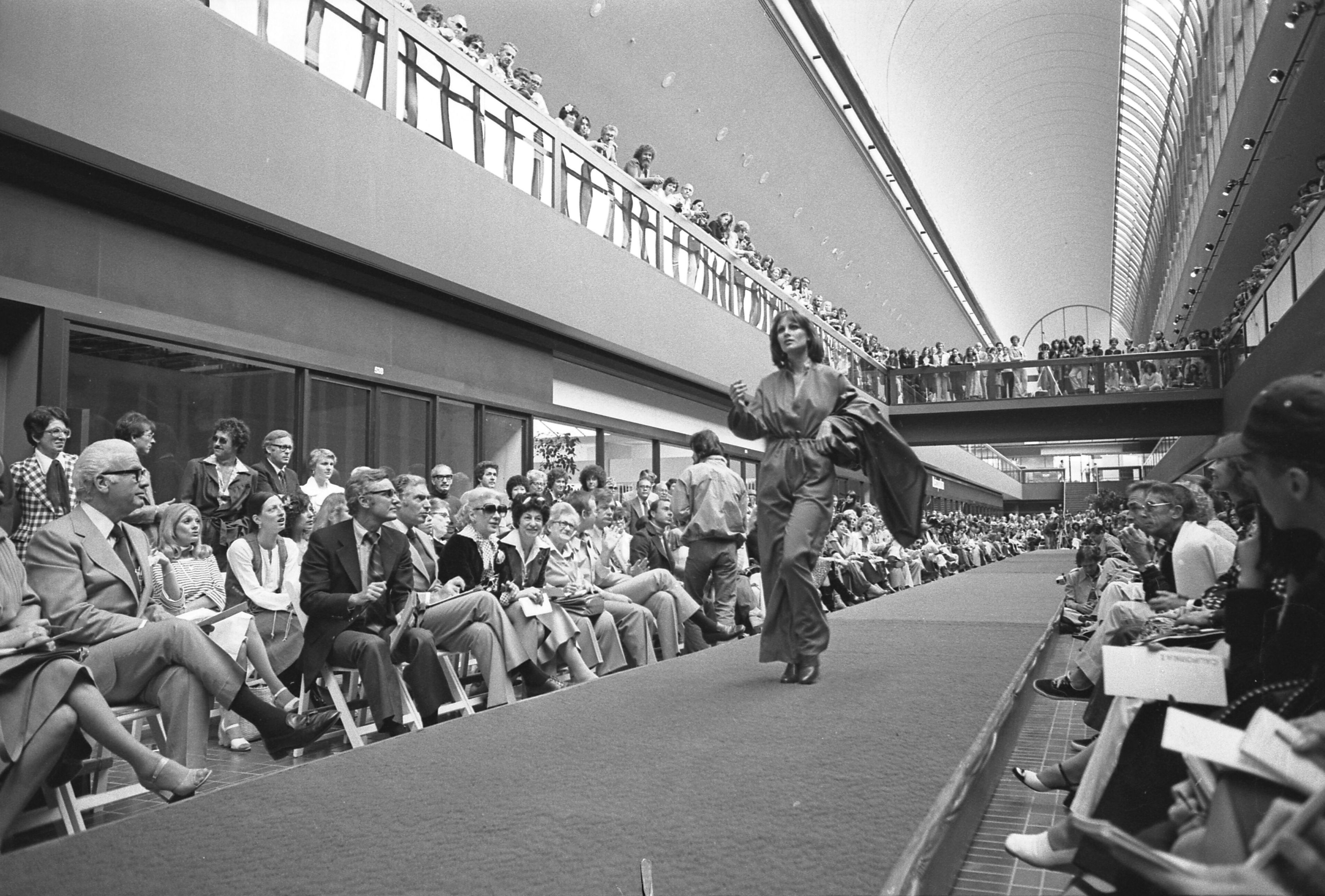
A fashion show at the Pacific Design Center, 1976

== Tenants ==
Entity	Location
WeWork	Red Building
