= Margot Siegel =

American journalist

- Born: April 2, 1923 (age 103)
- Died: February 24, 2015 (aged 91)

Margot Siegel (April 2, 1923 – February 24, 2015) was an American journalist.

== Early life and education ==
Margot Siegel was born April 2, 1923, in St. Paul, Minnesota. Her parents were Jeanne and William Auerbacher. She graduated from University High School in 1940. She completed her B.E in journalism and advertising from the University of Minnesota in 1944.

== Career ==
Siegel was also the first teaching assistant in the university's new American Studies program. She was a news and feature writer in the American Red Cross during World War II. Later she became a reporter and editor at Women's Wear Daily in New York, after a stint in Hollywood as a publicist. She also worked as an overseas correspondent from 1947 to 1948 for Fairchild Publications, the parent company of Women's Wear.

After returning to Minneapolis in the 1950s she married attorney Harold Siegel, with whom she had two children, William and Sandra, followed later by three grandchildren. She became the public relations director of Walker Art Center in the 1960s. Siegel contributed to the Encyclopedia of Clothing and Fashion. She was the co-owner of Siegel-Hogan Enterprises for almost 17 years. After the death of her husband in 1989, she took over his real estate company which became Siegel Properties. She was a member of the Overseas Press Club of America and a charter member of the now-defunct Minnesota Press Club.

Siegel was also a member and former director of the Minneapolis/St. Paul Fashion Group. In her later years, Siegel founded the Palm Spring Fashion Group as well as the Friends of the Goldstein. In 2012, the museum paid tribute to her with its Margot Siegel Design Award, which honors emerging designers. Siegel died February 24, 2015, aged 91.

== Fashion collection ==
The collection was prominently featured in the Goldstein's 2011 pop-art exhibit Intersections: Where Art Meets Fashion. Among its contents were:

- A silk two-piece Mission ensemble in a multicolored tulip pattern
- Halston plunge-back dress inspired by the art of Jackson Pollock

== The Margot Siegel Design Award ==
The Goldstein Museum of Design announced a new award for emerging designers: The Margot Siegel Design Award. This award is presented annually to a designer who represents innovation in his/her field and has yet to receive major recognition. The winner of the award receives an all-expense-paid trip to the Twin Cities to speak at the College of Design.
