= Graham Foundation for Advanced Studies in the Fine Arts =

Arts organization

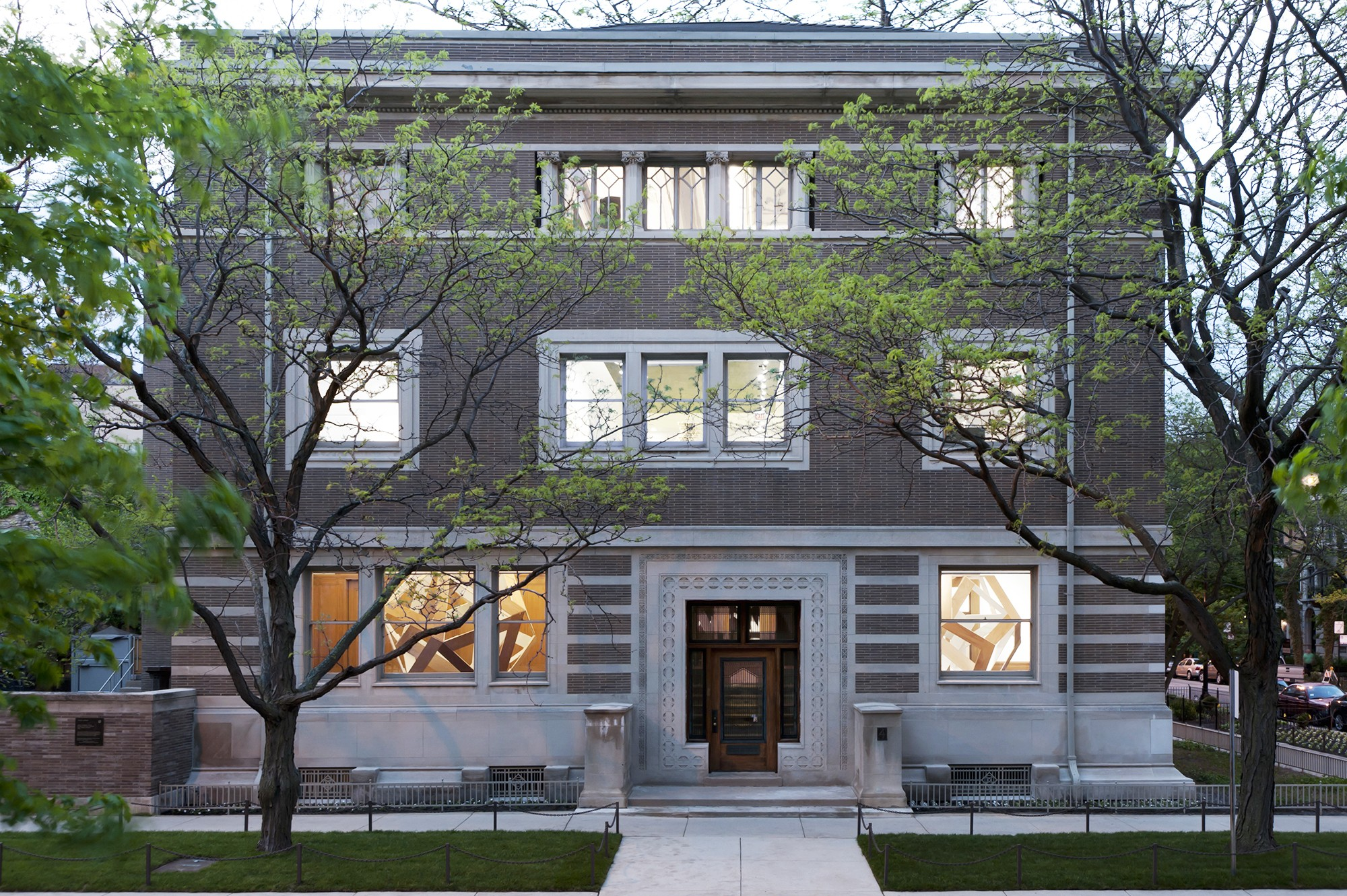
- Founded: 1956
- Type: Non-profit organization
- Location: Madlener House; Chicago, IL
- Website: grahamfoundation.org

The Graham Foundation for Advanced Studies in the Fine Arts is a 501(c)3 non-profit that "fosters the development and exchange of diverse and challenging ideas about architecture and its role in the arts, culture, and society. The Graham realizes this vision through making project-based grants to individuals and organizations and producing exhibitions, events, and publications."

It is located in the Madlener House in Chicago's Gold Coast neighborhood. As of 2018, the Graham Foundation has awarded over 4,400 grants.

== Grants ==
The Graham foundation provides two types of grants to individuals: Production and Presentation Grants and Research and Development Grants. Grantees are chosen based on four criteria: originality, potential for impact, feasibility, and capacity. Part of the Graham Foundation's mission includes supporting the developing careers of grantees and enabling projects that would not otherwise be possible. The Graham Foundation's 11-member Board of Trustees selects the cohort of grantees each year. Current and former board members include John Ronan and Theaster Gates.

Grantee projects range from interactive exhibitions and workshops to books and documentary films. Past projects include a photographic survey of Le Corbusier’s completed works and an online oral history of housing construction for homeless individuals living with HIV/AIDS in New York City. The Graham Foundation has supported the publication of several field-defining architecture books, Robert Venturi's Complexity and Contradiction in Architecture and Rem Koolhaas's Delirious New York among them.

In July 2020, The Graham Foundation for Advanced Studies in the Fine Arts reported a total of 52 awards worth $320,800. Grants will fund important projects tackling and shaping the future of architecture and the developed environment.

== Public Programming ==
The Graham Foundation aims to foster dialogue and expand the audience around architecture and its impacts on society and culture. To that end, the organization hosts galleries, an outdoor collection of architectural fragments, an archive of grantee publications, and a ballroom for lectures and events open to the public. Notable architects including Rem Koolhaas, Denise Scott Brown, Robert Venturi, Buckminster Fuller, and Louis Kahn have lectured and held exhibitions there.

The Graham Foundation Bookshop, also located in the Madlener house, houses grant-funded titles, international periodicals, and rare publications on architecture, urbanism, and related fields.

== See also ==
- Madlener House
- Architectural theory
