= Saint Luke's Tower =

Skyscraper in Japan

Coordinates: 35°40′.4″N 139°46′44″E

- 聖路加ガーデン
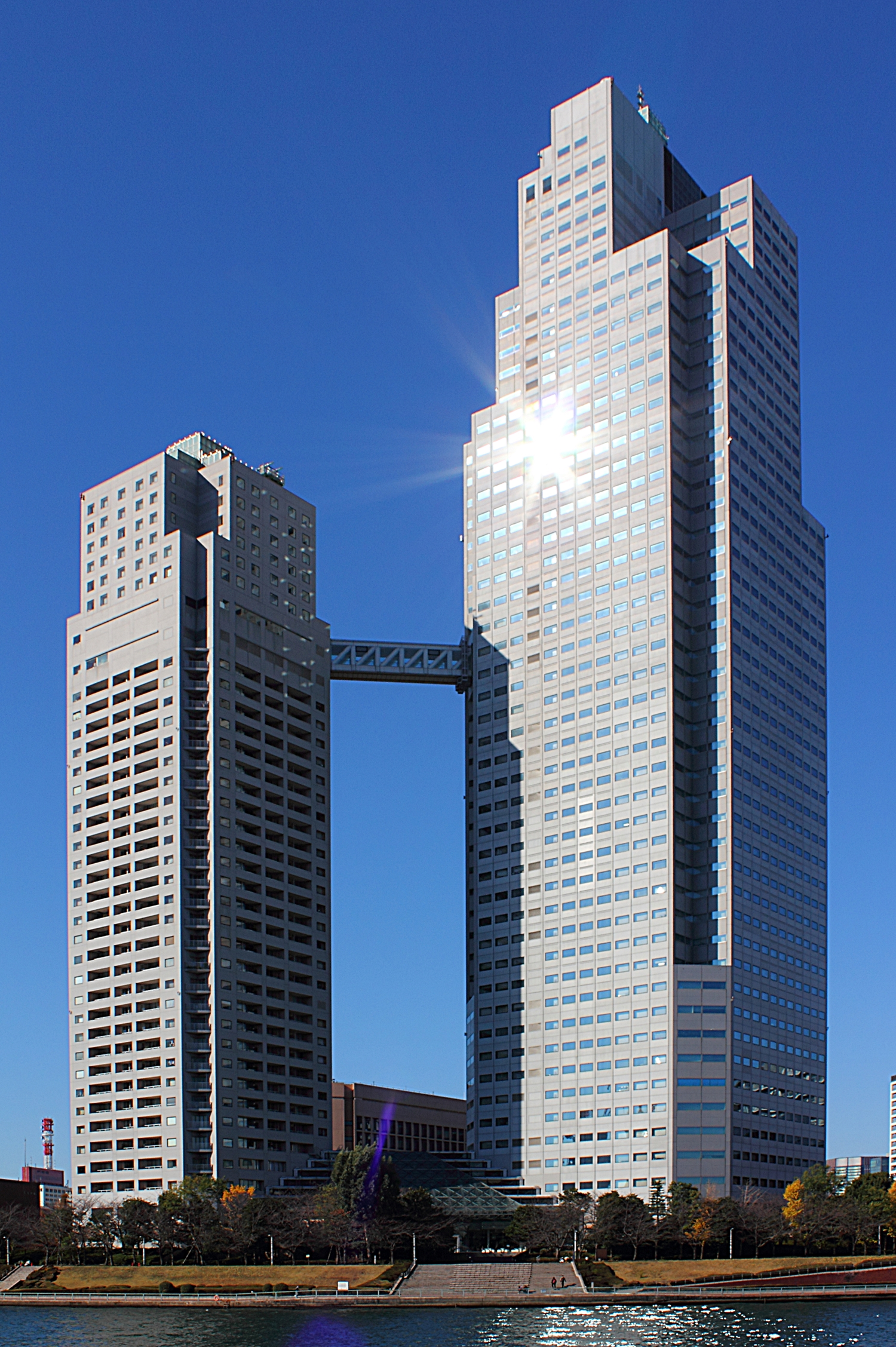
- Interactive map of the Saint Luke's Tower area

General information
- Location: Chūō, Tokyo, Japan

The Saint Luke's Tower (Japanese: 聖路加タワー, Hepburn: Sei Ruka Tawā) is a skyscraper located in Chūō, Tokyo, Japan. Construction of the 221-meter, 47-story skyscraper was finished in 1994.

== Notable tenants ==
- Nintendo Cube
