= Cradle (sculpture) =

2010 sculpture in Santa Monica, California, U.S.

- Location: Santa Monica, California, U.S.
- 34°0′53″N 118°29′36″W

Cradle is a 2010 sculpture by Ball-Nogues Studio, installed in Santa Monica, California, United States. The artwork was commissioned by the City of Santa Monica, and assembled in Burbank. James Jones was the project's lead fabricator.

== See also ==
- 2010 in art
- List of public art in Santa Monica, California
