= Architectural League Emerging Voices =

Annual design competition organized by the Architectural League of New York

Emerging Voices is an invited, annual competition organized by the Architectural League of New York for North American firms and individuals with distinct design voices and significant bodies of realized work.

== List of Emerging Voices ==
=== 2021 ===
- Beyond the Built Environment
- CÚRE & PENABAD
- Kounkuey Design Initiative
- Lori A. Brown
- Low Design Office
- PLY+
- Studio Zewde
- Taller Capital

=== 2020 ===
- Blouin Orzes architectes
- Dake Wells Architecture
- Escobedo Soliz
- Mork Ulnes Architects
- Olalekan Jeyifous
- Peterson Rich Office
- PORT
- Young Projects

=== 2019 ===
- Colloqate
- Davies Toews
- FreelandBuck
- Ignacio Urquiza, Bernardo Quinzaños, CCA
- MODU
- SCHAUM/SHIEH
- UUfie
- Waechter Architecture

=== 2018 ===
- Fernanda Canales, Jesica Amescua and Mariana Ordóñez Grajales, Comunal: Taller de Arquitectura
- Stephanie Davidson and Georg Rafailidis, Davidson Rafailidis
- Luis Aldrete, Estudio de Arquitectura
- David Seiter, Future Green Studio
- Helen Leung and Elizabeth Timme, LA-Más
- Chris Baribeau, Josh Siebert, and Jason Wright, modus studio

=== 2017 ===
- BLDGS
- Cadaval & Solà-Morales
- Duvall Decker Architects
- Frida Escobedo, Taller de Arquitectura
- Leong Leong
- LEVER Architecture
- OJT
- Scott & Scott Architects

=== 2016 ===
- Alex Anmahian and Nick Winton: Anmahian Winton Architects
- Omar Gandhi: Omar Gandhi Architect
- Cesar Guerrero, Ana Cecilia Garza, Carlos Flores, and Maria Sevilla: S-AR
- Frank Jacobus and Marc Manack: SILO AR+D
- Jon Lott: PARA Project and Collective-LOK
- E.B. Min and Jeffrey L. Day: Min Day
- Rozana Montiel: Estudio de Arquitectura
- Heather Roberge: Murmur

=== 2015 ===
- Benjamin Aranda, Chris Lasch: Aranda\Lasch
- Manuel Cervantes Cespedes: MANUEL CERVANTES CESPEDES/ CC ARQUITECTOS
- Gabriela Etchegaray, Jorge Ambrosi: AMBROSI ETCHEGARAY
- Alejandro Guerrero, Andrea SOTO: Atelier ARS°
- Neri Oxman: Mediated Matter Group, MIT Media Lab
- Brian Phillips: ISA
- Roberto Rovira: Studio Roberto Rovira
- Elizabeth Whittaker: Merge Architects

=== 2014 ===
- David Benjamin: The Living
- Geoff di Girolamo, James Lord, Roderick Wyllie: Surfacedesign, Inc.
- Basar Girit, Aleksey Lukyanov-Cherny, Wes Rozen, Bradley Samuels: SITU Studio
- Joyce Hwang: Ants of the Prairie
- Salvador Macias Corona, Magui Peredo Arenas: Estudio Macías Peredo
- Ronald Rael, Virginia San Fratello: Rael San Fratello
- Mauricio Rocha, Gabriela Carrillo: TALLER Mauricio Rocha + Gabriela Carrillo
- Donald Chong, Betsy Williamson, Shane Williamson: Williamson Chong Architects

=== 2013 ===
- Andy Cao, Xavier Perrot: cao perrot
- Jules Dingle, Jeff Goldstein, Mark Sanderson, Jamie Unkefer: DIGSAU
- Susannah Churchill Drake: Dlandstudio architecture and landscape architecture
- Jorge Garcia: graciastudio
- Sierra Bainbridge, Michael Murphy, Alan Ricks, David Saladik: MASS Design Group
- Luke Ogrydziak, Zoë Prillinger: Ogrydziak Prillinger
- Carlos Bedoya, Wonne Ickx, Victor Jaime, Abel Perles: PRODUCTORA
- Florian Idenburg, Jing Liu: SO – IL

=== 2012 ===
- Johanna Hurme, Sasa Radulovic: 5468796 Architecture
- Jose Castillo, Saidee Springall: arquitectura911sc
- Manon Asselin, Katsuhiro Yamazaki: Atelier TAG
- Jeffrey Inaba: INABA
- Dwayne Oyler, Jenny Wu: Oyler Wu Collaborative
- Elena Brescia, Kate Orff: SCAPE / LANDSCAPE ARCHITECTURE
- John Hong, Jinhee Park: SsD
- Christos Marcopoulos, Carol Moukheiber: Studio (n-1)

=== 2011 ===
- Benjamin Ball, Gaston Nogues: Ball-Nogues Studio
- Roberto de Leon, Jr., M. Ross Primmer: de Leon & Primmer Architecture Workshop
- Tobias Armborst, Dan D’Oca, Georgeen Theodore: Interboro Partners
- Lola Sheppard, Mason White: Lateral Office
- Georgina Huljich, Marcelo Spina: P-A-T-T-E-R-N-S
- Karel Klein, David Ruy: Ruy Klein
- B. Alex Miller, Jeff Taylor: Taylor and Miller Architecture and Design
- Layng Pew, Claire Weisz, Mark Yoes: WXY Architecture + Urban Design

=== 2010 ===
- James Dallman, Grace La: LA DALLMAN
- Ziad Jamaleddine, Makram el Kadi: L.E.FT
- Stephanie Forsythe, Todd MacAllen: molo
- Michel Rojkind: rojkind arquitectos
- Hayes Slade, James Slade: Slade Architecture
- Sunil Bald, Yolande Daniels: studioSUMO
- Tatiana Bilbao: Tatiana Bilbao
- Sarah Dunn, Martin Felsen: UrbanLab

=== 2009 ===
- Darren Petrucci: A-I-R [Architecture-Infrastructure-Research]
- Andrew D. Berman: Andrew Berman Architect
- Julio Amezcua, Francisco Pardo: AT103
- Shane Coen: Coen + Partners
- Derek Dellekamp: Dellekamp Arquitectos
- Elizabeth Gray, Alan Organschi: Gray Organschi Architecture
- Robert Hutchinson, Tom Maul: Hutchison & Maul
- Stella Betts, David Leven: LEVENBETTS

=== 2008 ===
- Hagy Belzberg: Belzberg Architects
- Jamie Darnell, David Dowell, Dan Maginn, Josh Shelton, Douglas Stockman: el dorado
- Brian Johnsen, Sebastian Schmaling: Johnsen Schmaling Architects
- Granger Moorhead, Robert Moorhead: Moorhead & Moorhead
- Michael Meredith, Hilary Sample: MOS Architects
- Johnny McDonald, Patrick McDonald, Tim McDonald, Howard Steinberg: Onion Flats
- Chris Reed: Stoss Landscape Urbanism
- Amale Andraos, Dan Wood: WORKac

=== 2007 ===
- Ammar Eloueini: Ammar Eloueini Digit-all Studio
- An Te Liu: An Te Liu
- Mark Anderson, Peter Anderson: Anderson Anderson Architecture
- Andrew Bernheimer, Jared Della Valle: Della Valle Bernheimer
- Eric Höweler, Meejin Yoon: Höweler + Yoon Architecture / MY Studio
- Lisa Iwamoto, Craig Scott: IwamotoScott Architecture
- Sharon Johnston, Mark Lee: Johnston Marklee
- Victor F. “Trey” Trahan III: Trahan Architects

=== 2006 ===
- Thomas Bercy, Calvin Chen: Bercy Chen Studio
- Mark Goulthorpe: dECOi Architects
- Frank Escher, Ravi GuneWardena: Escher GuneWardena
- Teddy Cruz: Estudio Teddy Cruz
- George Yu: George Yu Architects
- Annie Han, Daniel Mihalyo: Lead Pencil Studio
- Eric Bunge, Mimi Hoang: nARCHITECTS
- Jeanne Gang: Studio Gang Architects

=== 2005 ===
- Taryn Christoff, Martin Finio: Christoff:Finio
- Claude Cormier: Claude Cormier architectes paysagistes
- Lauren Crahan, John Hartmann: Freecell
- John Ronan: John Ronan Architects
- Pablo Castro, Jennifer Lee: OBRA Architects
- John Frane, Hadrian Predock: Predock Frane Architects
- Gary Hilderbrand, Douglas Reed: Reed Hilderbrand Landscape Architecture
- Zoltan Pali: Studio Pali Fekete architects (SPF:a)

=== 2004 ===
- Pierre Thibault: Atelier Pierre Thibault
- Rand Elliott: Elliott + Associates Architects
- John Friedman, Alice Kimm: John Friedman Alice Kimm Architects
- Lorcan O'Herlihy: Lorcan O’Herlihy Architects
- Tom Kundig: Olson Kundig Architects
- Preston Scott Cohen: Preston Scott Cohen Studio
- Lawrence Scarpa: Pugh + Scarpa
- Ken Smith: WORKSHOP: Ken Smith Landscape Architect

=== 2003 ===
- David Brininstool, Brad Lynch: Brininstool + Lynch
- Frank Harmon: Frank Harmon Architect
- Margie Ruddick: Margie Ruddick Landscape
- Monica Ponce de Leon, Nader Tehrani: Office dA
- Jennifer Siegal: Office of Mobile Design
- Peter Lynch: Peter Lynch Architect

=== 2002 ===
- Thom Faulders: Beige Design
- Byron Kuth, Elizabeth Ranieri: Kuth Ranieri Architects
- David Lewis, Paul Lewis, Marc Tsurumaki: Lewis Tsurumaki Lewis Architects (LTL Architects)
- Marwan Al-Sayed: Marwan Al-Sayed Architects (MASA)
- Alan Koch, Lyn Rice, Galia Solomonoff, Linda Taalman: OpenOffice Architects
- Ali Tayar: Parallel Design Partnership
- Louise Harpman, Scott Specht: Specht Harpman
- Andrew Zago: Zago Architecture

=== 2001 ===
- Winka Dubbeldam: ARCHI-TECTONICS
- Stephen Cassell & Adam Yarinsky: Architecture Research Office (ARO)
- Douglas Garofalo: Garofalo Architects
- Mario Gooden, Ray Huff: Huff + Gooden Architects
- James Corner: James Corner Field Operations
- Kelly Bauer, Jim Richärd: richärd + bauer
- Jonathan Marvel, Robert Rogers: Rogers Marvel Architects
- André Perrotte, Gilles Saucier: Saucier + Perrotte architectes
- Kimberly Holden, Gregg Pasquarelli, Christopher Sharples, Coren Sharples, William Sharples: SHoP Architects
- Mehrdad Yazdani: Yazdani Studio of Cannon Design

=== 2000 ===
- Brian MacKay-Lyons: Brian MacKay-Lyons Architecture Urban Design
- David Heymann: David Heymann, Architect \\ Michael Underhill, David Heymann, and Laura J. Miller, Architects
- Julie Bargmann: D.I.R.T. studio
- Robert Hull, David Miller: The Miller Hull Partnership
- Lisa Rapoport: PLANT Architect
- Rick Joy: Rick Joy Architects

=== 1999 ===
- Lise Anne Couture, Hani Rashid: Asymptote Architecture
- Brian Healy: Brian Healy Architects
- Kevin Daly, Chris Genik: Daly Genik
- Evan Douglis: Evan Douglis Studio
- Raveevarn Choksombatchai, Ralph Nelson: Loom Studio
- Giuseppe Ligano, Ada Tolla: LOT-EK
- Michael Bell: Michael Bell Architecture
- Wendell Burnette: Wendell Burnette Architects

=== 1998 ===
- Sarah Caples, Everardo Jefferson: Caples Jefferson Architects
- François de Menil: François de Menil Architect
- Michael Gabellini: Gabellini Associates
- Julie V. Snow: Julie Snow Architects
- Karen Fairbanks, Scott Marble: Marble Fairbanks
- Marlon Blackwell: Marlon Blackwell Architect
- Michael Maltzan: Michael Maltzan Architecture
- Vincent James: Vincent James Associates

=== 1997 ===
- Anne Perl de Pal: Perl de Pal Architects
- Kathryn Dean, Charles Wolf: Dean/Wolf Architects
- Tom Buresh, Danelle Guthrie: Guthrie+Buresh Architects
- Michele Saee: SAEE Studio
- Charles Rose, Maryann Thompson: Thompson and Rose Architects
- Michael Manfredi, Marion Weiss: WEISS/MANFREDI Architecture/Landscape/Urbanism

=== 1996 ===
- Brad Cloepfil: Allied Works
- Audrey Matlock: Audrey Matlock Architect
- Clifton Balch, Mojdeh Baratloo: Baratloo-Balch Architects
- Craig Konyk: Konyk Architecture
- Linda Lindroth, Craig Newick: Lindroth + Newick \\ Newick Architects
- Louise Braverman: Louise Braverman, Architect
- Jesse Reiser, Nanako Umemoto: Reiser + Umemoto
- Carlos Zapata: Carlos Zapata Design Studio (CZDS)

=== 1995 ===
- Neil Denari: Cor-Tex Architecture
- Homa Farjadi: Farjadi/Mostafavi Associates
- Gisue Hariri, Mojgan Hariri: Hariri & Hariri
- Chuck Hoberman: Hoberman Associates
- Susan Lanier, Paul Lubowicki: Lubowicki Lanier Architecture
- Mark Rakatansky: Mark Rakatansky Studio
- Brigitte Shim, Howard Sutcliffe: Shim-Sutcliffe Architects
- Wellington Reiter: Urban Instruments

=== 1994 ===
- Marc Angélil, Sarah Graham: Angélil/Graham Architecture
- Carlos Jimenez: Carlos Jimenez Studio
- Gary Cunningham: Cunningham Architects
- Nicholas Goldsmith: FTL Happold
- James Cutler: James Cutler Architects
- Sheila Kennedy, Frano Violich: Kennedy & Violich Architecture (KVA)
- William Leddy, Marsha Maytum, Richard Stacy, James L. Tanner: Tanner Leddy Maytum Stacy Architect
- Enrique Norten: TEN Arquitectos

=== 1993 ===
- David Piscuskas, Juergen Riehm: 1100 Architect
- Peggy Deamer, Scott Phillips: Deamer + Phillips, Architecture
- Deborah Berke: Deborah Berke Architect
- Thomas Hanrahan, Victoria Meyers: hanrahan Meyers architects
- Joel Sanders: Joel Sanders Architect
- Laszlo Kiss, Todd Zwigard: Kiss + Zwigard
- Thomas Leeser: Leeser Architecture
- Stan Allen: Stan Allen Architect

=== 1992 ===
- Karen Bausman, Leslie Gill: Bausman Gill Associates
- Ron Golan, Eric A. Kahn, Russell N. Thomsen: Central Office of Architecture
- Sulan Kolatan, William Mac Donald: Kolatan/Mac Donald Studio
- Ted Flato, David Lake: Lake Flato Architects
- Adrian Luchini: Schwetye Luchini Maritz Architects
- Toshiko Mori: Toshiko Mori Architect

=== 1990 ===
- Wes Jones, Peter Pfau: Holt Hinshaw Pfau Jones
- John Keenen, Terry Riley: Keenen Riley Architects
- Julie Eizenberg, Hank Koning: Koning Eizenberg Architecture
- Coleman Coker, Samuel Mockbee: Mockbee/Coker Architects
- Ralph Johnson: Perkins+Will
- Walter Chatham: Walter Chatham Architect

=== 1989 ===
- Lars Lerup: Lars Lerup
- Mark Mack: Mack Architect(s)
- Warren Schwartz, Robert Silver: Schwartz/Silver Architects
- Steven Harris: Steven Harris Architects
- Zack McKown, Calvin Tsao: TsAO & McKOWN Architects
- William L. Rawn: William Rawn Associates

=== 1988 ===
- Ross Anderson, Frederic Schwartz: Anderson/Schwartz Architects
- Brian A. Murphy: BAM Construction/Design
- W. G. Clark: Clark and Menefee
- Harry Teague: Harry Teague Architects
- Peter Forbes: Peter Forbes & Associates
- Ralph Lerner: Ralph Lerner Architect
- Patricia Sapinsley: Sapinsley Architecture
- Merrill Elam, Mack Scogin: Scogin Elam and Bray Architects

=== 1986 ===
- Bart Prince: Bart Prince, Architect
- Peter de Bretteville: de Bretteville/Polyzoides
- Mark Simon: Centerbrook Architects & Planners
- Paul Haigh: Haigh Space
- Susie Kim, Fred Koetter: Koetter, Kim & Associates
- Peter C. Papademetriou: Peter C. Papademetriou
- Ted Smith: Smith and Others Architects
- Turner Brooks: Turner Brooks, Architect

=== 1985 ===
- Heather Willson Cass, Patrick Pinnell: Cass & Pinnell Architects
- Richard Fernau, Laura Hartman: Fernau + Hartman Architects
- Darcy Bonner, Scott Himmel: Himmel/Bonner Architects
- Lawrence W. Speck
- William McDonough, J. Woodson Rainey, Jr.: McDonough, Rainey Architects
- Rob Wellington Quigley: Rob Wellington Quigley
- Diane Legge Kemp: Skidmore, Owings & Merrill
- Wayne Berg: Wayne Berg, Architect

=== 1984 ===
- Ronald Bentley, Salvatore LaRosa, Franklin Salasky: Bentley LaRosa Salasky
- Joseph Valerio: Chrysalis Corporation Architects
- Eric Owen Moss: Eric Owen Moss Architects
- Frederick Fisher: Frederick Fisher, Architect
- Henry Smith-Miller: Henry Smith-Miller, Architect
- Robert James Coote: Robert James Coote, Architect
- Stanley Saitowitz: Stanley Saitowitz Office
- Theodore M. Ceraldi: Theodore Ceraldi, Architect

=== 1983 ===
- Anthony Ames: Anthony Ames Architect
- Andres Duany, Elizabeth Plater-Zyberk: Duany Plater-Zyberk & Company
- Ronald Adrian Krueck: Krueck & Olsen Architects
- David T. Jones, I. Guyman Martin: Martin & Jones Architects
- Thom Mayne, Michael Rotondi: Morphosis
- Richard Oliver: Richard Oliver Architect
- Peter D. Waldman: Peter D. Waldman Architect
- Peter Wilso: Wilson Associates

=== 1982 ===
- Susana Torre: The Architectural Studio
- Laurinda Spear: Arquitectonica
- Jon Michael Schwarting: The Design Collaborative
- Franklin D. Israel: Franklin D. Israel Design Associates
- David Slovic: Friday Architects
- George Ranalli: George Ranalli, Architect
- Lauretta Vinciarelli: Lauretta Vinciarelli
- Giuseppe Zambonini: Open Atelier of Design
- Paul Segal: Paul Segal Associates Architects
- Roger C. Ferri: Roger C. Ferri and Associates
- Steven Holl: Steven Holl Architects
- Stuart Cohen, Anders Nereim: Stuart Cohen and Anders Nereim Architects
- John J. Casbarian, Danny M. Samuels, Robert H. Timme: Taft Architects
- Tod Williams: Tod Williams Associates
