= De Leon & Primmer Architecture Workshop =

American architectural firm

de Leon and Primmer Architecture Workshop (DPAW) is an architectural firm based in Louisville, Kentucky. Founded by Roberto de Leon and Ross Primmer in 2003, the firm is known for its cultural, civic and non-profit projects.

== Background ==
DPAW's work is characterized by utilizing the potential of conventional material and construction methods, prioritizing the richness of local cultures and resources, and highlighting contextual specificity in each project. The firm has received many recognitions and awards, including the 2010 Design Vanguard by Architectural Record and the 2011 Emerging Voices by the Architectural League of New York.

In 2015, DPAW was selected for the Northwest Arkansas Design Excellence Program, leading to the program's first completed project, the Rogers Historical Museum. DPAW's work has been exhibited in several international venues, including the 2011 Beijing International Design Triennial and the 2021 Venice Architecture Biennale. The firm has received three AIA Honors Awards in Architecture for their Mason Lane Farm Operations Facility in 2013, Wild Turkey Bourbon Visitor Center in 2015, and Owsley Brown II Historic Center in 2022. In 2023, DPAW was recognized by the American Academy of Arts and Letters with the Prize in Architecture. In 2025, DPAW's Historic Locust Grove Pavilion was featured in the U.S. Pavilion exhibition 'PORCH: An Architecture of Generosity' at the 19th International Architecture exhibition of the Venice Biennale.

== Principals ==
Roberto de Leon and Ross Primmer are the co-founders and principals of DPAW.

de Leon and Primmer both hold Master of Architecture degrees from the Harvard Graduate School of Design. de Leon holds a Bachelor of Arts in Architecture from the University of California, Berkeley. Primmer holds a Bachelor of Science in Architecture and Philosophy from Kent State University. Both are Fellows of The American Institute of Architects.

de Leon and Primmer have served as visiting critics, adjunct professors, and lecturers at various academic institutions, including Syracuse University, the University of North Carolina Charlotte, the Rural Studio / Auburn University, the University of Kentucky, and the J. Irwin Miller Architecture Program at Indiana University. They have also served as lecturers at numerous design conferences, including the 2022 Place of Practice, Practice of Place Symposium at the University of Arkansas, the 2017 ARQfestival in Guadalajara, Mexico, the 2016 Modern Lecture Series at the Modern Art Museum in Fort Worth, Texas, and the 2015 AIA National Convention in Atlanta, GA.

In 2012, de Leon served as a panelist for the national advisory conference Mayor's Institute on City Design. Primmer has served on the Board of the Louisville Metro Government's Landmark Commission, and has participated in citywide focus groups and planning committees.

== Selected awards ==
- 2010 Design Vanguard, Architectural Record
- 2011 Emerging Voices, Architectural League of New York
- 2013 AIA Honor Award for Architecture (Mason Lane Farm)
- 2015 AIA Honor Award for Architecture (Wild Turkey Bourbon Visitor Center)
- 2022 AIA Honor Award for Architecture (The Owsley Brown II History Center)
- 2023 American Academy of Arts and Letters Award in Architecture

== Selected works ==
- The Filson Historical Society campus expansion and renovation – Louisville, KY (2017)
- Historic Locust Grove – Louisville, KY (2022)
- Knoxville Botanical Garden and Arboretum, Dogwood Center – Knoxville, TN (2015)
- Lloyd Library and Museum – Cincinnati, OH (2023-in progress)
- Mason Lane Farm – Goshen, KY (2009)
- Rogers Historical Museum – Rogers, AK (2018)
- Wild Turkey Bourbon Visitor Center – Lawrenceburg, KY (2013)
- Yew Dell Botanical Gardens (multiple projects) – Goshen, KY (2003–2020)

== Selected publications ==
- Galindo, Michelle; Kress, Kristin; Nauck, Franziska, eds. (2008). 1000x Architecture of the Americas. Verlagshaus Braun.
- Gregory, Daniel P. (2020). The New Farm: Contemporary Rural Architecture. Princeton Architectural Press.
- Hall, William (2017). Wood. Phaidon Press.
- Keaton, Diane (2012). House. Rizzoli International Publications.
- Killory, Christine; Davids, Rene (2012). Asbuilt 3: Details, Technology and Form. Princeton Architectural Press.

== Exhibitions ==
- 2010 Wood2010, Smaland, Sweden
- 2011 Beijing International Design Triennial, Beijing, China
- 2014 Istanbul Design Biennial, Istanbul, Turkey
- 2021 Venice Biennale, Venice, Italy
- 2025 Venice Biennale, Venice, Italy

== Media ==
DPAW was featured in Season 1, Episode 2 of the television series America by Design: Architecture, which highlights contemporary American design practices.
