= Pablo Castro =

Pablo Castro may refer to:

- Pablo Castro Estevez (born 1959), Argentine architect
- Pablo Castro (writer), pseudonym of the Spanish writer Nuria C. Botey (born 1977)
- Pablo Castro (footballer, born 1985), Uruguayan footballer
- Pablo Castro (footballer, born 2000), Paraguayan footballer
