= John Ochsendorf =

Structural engineer, architectural historian

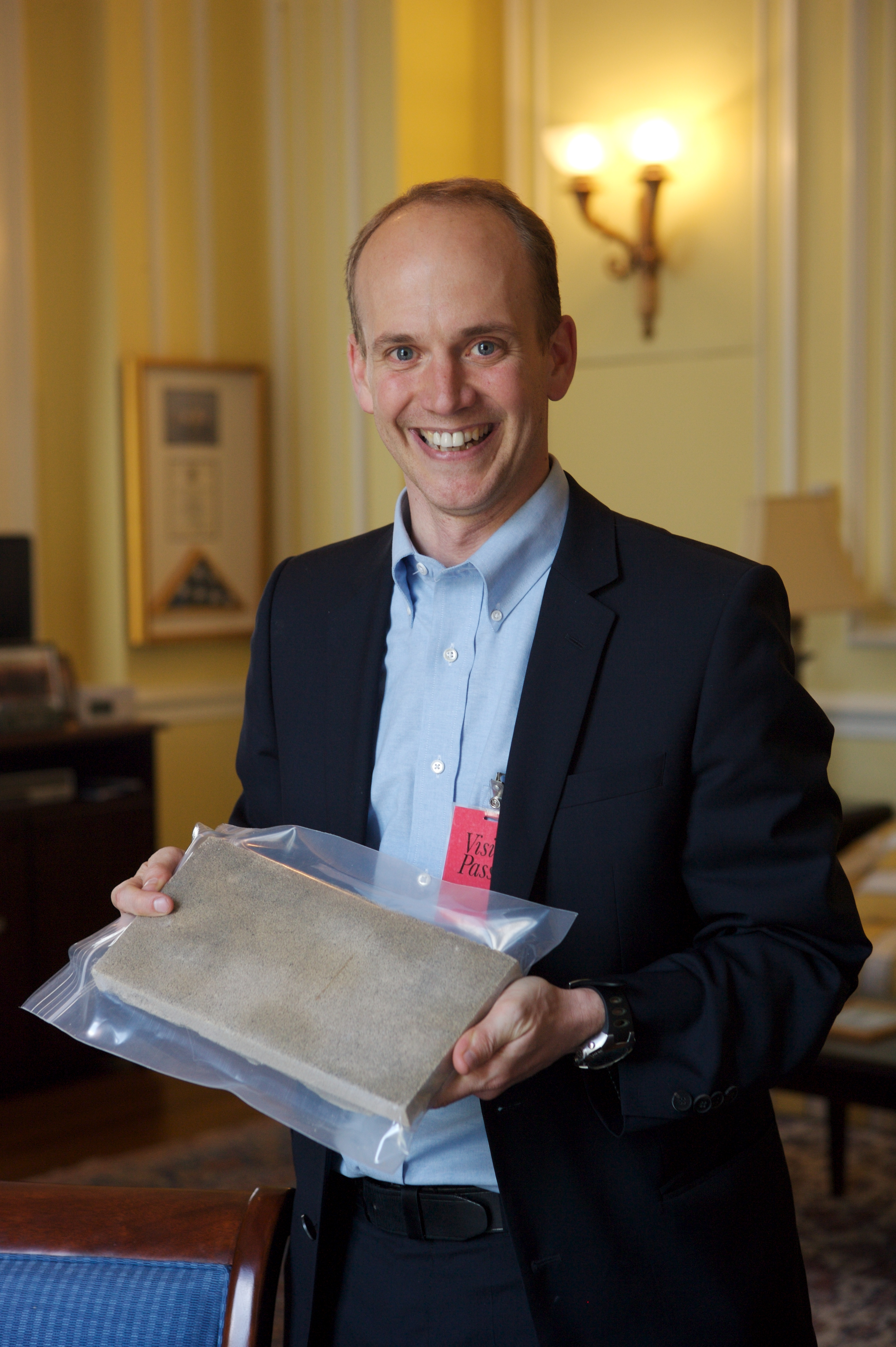
- Ochsendorf on a tour in Washington DC (2011)
- Born: May 22, 1974 (age 52); Columbus, Ohio, US
- Education: Cornell University (BSc 1996); Princeton University (MSc 1998); University of Cambridge (PhD 2002)
- Occupations: Structural engineer, architectural historian, professor
- Known for: Studies of historic structures, innovative designs
- Spouse: Anne Carney
- Website: John Ochsendorf at the MIT School of Architecture and Planning

John Ochsendorf (born May 22, 1974) is an American educator, structural engineer, and historian of construction; he is a professor in the Department of Architecture and the Department of Civil and Environmental Engineering at the Massachusetts Institute of Technology. He is widely known for becoming a MacArthur Fellow in 2008 He served as the director of the American Academy in Rome from 2017 to 2020. In 2022, he was appointed the founding director of the newly created MIT Morningside Academy for Design (MIT MAD).

== Early years and education ==
Ochsendorf grew up in Elkins, West Virginia; he was educated at Elkins High School, Cornell University, Princeton University, and the University of Cambridge. His university degrees are in structural engineering and he minored in archaeology at Cornell.

He also studied in Spain as a predoctoral scholar under the Fulbright Program in 2000–2001.

== Career ==
Ochsendorf joined the MIT faculty in 2002, and holds a joint appointment in the MIT Department of Civil and Environmental Engineering (CEE) and the Department of Architecture. He teaches both undergraduate and graduate courses, and serves on a number of faculty committees.

Ochsendorf is known for using architecture and engineering to study and restore ancient structures and sometimes draws upon ancient building methods for the benefit of contemporary construction. He has studied Incan simple suspension bridges and the earthquake-worthiness of Gothic cathedrals.

Ochsendorf also curated an exhibition Palaces for the People, featuring the history and legacy of Guastavino tile construction, which premiered in September 2012 at the Boston Public Library, Rafael Guastavino's first major architectural work in America. The exhibition then traveled to the National Building Museum in Washington DC, and an expanded version appeared at the Museum of the City of New York. Ochsendorf, a winner of the MacArthur Foundation "genius grant", also wrote the book-length color-illustrated monograph Guastavino vaulting : the art of structural tile, and an online exhibition coordinated with the traveling exhibits.

In addition, Ochsendorf directs the Guastavino Project at MIT, which researches and maintains the Guastavino.net online archive of related materials.

In 2022, it was announced that Ochsendorf would be founding director of the new MIT Morningside Academy for Design (MIT MAD), an interdisciplinary center which is part of the School of Architecture and Planning (SA+P). Initial funding came from a $100 million gift from The Morningside Foundation, the philanthropic arm of the T.H. Chan family.

== Engineering and artistic collaborations ==
=== Sean Collier Memorial ===
On April 29, 2015, MIT held special ceremonies dedicating the Sean Collier Memorial in honor of MIT Police officer Sean Collier, who had been killed by Boston Marathon bombers Tamerlan and Dzhokhar Tsarnaev two years earlier. Ochsendorf and his students were deeply involved with the structural engineering of the design, which was led by J. Meejin Yoon, the head of the MIT Department of Architecture. The memorial consists of 32 massive granite blocks precision-shaped under computer numerical control, and fitted together into a shallow open domed arch with 5 radial support wings splayed out like fingers of an open hand.

=== Lookout by Martin Puryear ===
In 2023, American sculptor Martin Puryear completed his first large-scale sculpture made of bricks, at Storm King Art Center in Mountainville, New York, in the Hudson Valley north of New York City. Called Lookout, the artwork is an asymmetrical compound-curved domed shell, pierced by 90 small apertures for circular viewports. Visitors can walk around and into the sculpture, enjoying the views of the surrounding area.

The overall patterning of the bricks was influenced by kilns in the UK, and especially by Nubian masons in Mali. Puryear had been thinking about his design for many years, when he had a conversation with Ochsendorf in 2019. Ochsendorf had an ongoing interest in ancient and traditional architectural technologies, and had already done his own studies of the Nubian bricklaying practices. They both immediately realized that a collaboration would advance the project, and began working together. They devised a two-layered brick structural shell sandwiching a steel grid for longterm structural stability of the relatively thin shell.

Ochsendorf recruited and led a team of MIT students and alumni to work on the structural engineering aspects of the project. Two undergrads and four master's students worked on the analytical modeling of the project, including computing the number of bricks required. The lead mason was Lara Davis, a former master's student, who also happened to be living and working near Storm King. Davis developed and tested a custom blend of natural cements to make up the high-strength mortar binding the masonry elements together. The process of building the artwork is shown in the 2023 documentary film, Martin Puryear: Lookout.

== Personal life ==
From 2010 to 2017, Ochsendorf and his wife Anne Carney served as heads of house of the MIT graduate student dormitory called "The Warehouse". He is an enthusiastic soccer player, and enjoys hiking, cycling, and camping. He has lived in Australia, England, Spain, and Italy, and speaks Spanish and Italian.

== Awards ==
- 2008 American Academy in Rome fellow in Historic Preservation & Conservation.
- 2008 MacArthur Fellows Program
- 2011 Senior Fellow of the Design Futures Council.

== Published works ==
- Guastavino Vaulting: The Art of Structural Tile (ISBN 1568987412, Princeton Architectural Press, 2010)
