= Atelier TAG =

Canadian architectural firm

- Company type: Architectural firm
- Industry: Architecture
- Founded: 1997
- Founder: Katsuhiro Yamazaki; Manon Asselin
- Headquarters: Montreal, Quebec, Canada
- Key people: Manon Asselin (Founding Partner), Katsuhiro Yamazaki (Founding Partner)
- Website: https://www.ateliertag.com/

Atelier TAG is a Canadian architecture firm based in Montreal, Quebec that specializes in architecture, interior design and urban design. The firm was founded in 1997 by McGill School of Architecture graduates Manon Asselin and Katsuhiro Yamazaki, and its name is in reference to the interdisciplinary matter of the practice, with "TAG" being an acronym for “technique + architecture + graphism” (technique + architecture + graphics in English).

As a prominent architectural practice in Montreal, the firm has received several awards such as the Award of Excellence from Ordre des architectes du Québec, Governor General’s Medal in Architecture, Prix de Rome from the Canadian Council for the Arts, the Grands Prix du Design, and the Emerging Voices Award from The Architectural League of New York. Currently, the firm's team consists of 8 full-time employees.

== History ==
As designs for all large scale projects in Quebec are selected through an architectural competition system, organized by the Ministry of Culture of the province, it has allowed many young architects an opportunity to submit their designs for major cultural projects. For the case of Atelier TAG, which was founded in 1997 by McGill University alumni Manon Asselin and Katsuhiro Yamakazi, the firm’s first project, the Châteauguay Library, was selected and completed through a province-wide competition in 1997. The design was realized in 2003 in consortium with Jodoin Lamarre Pratte (JLP) architectes, a large firm also based in Montreal. The project received great recognition and brought TAG to the national spotlight after they were awarded their first Governor-General’s Medal in Architecture in 2006.

Over the next few years, the firm continued their focus on institutional and cultural buildings, having later worked on the Théâtre du Vieux-Terrebonne (2004) and the Raymond-Lévesque Public Library (2011), both of which received the Governor-General’s Medal in Architecture in consortium with JLP in 2006 and 2014 respectively. In 2008, the firm was awarded the prestigious Prix de Rome in architecture, which granted them $50,000 “to travel around the world to hone their skills, develop their creative practice and strengthen their presence in international architecture culture”. TAG was awarded the Award of Excellence from Ordre des architectes du Québec twice, both in 2013 and 2017.The Michal and Renata Hornstein Pavilion for Peace within the Montreal Museum of Fine Arts (2016), designed in consortium with JLP, led them to win their fourth Governor-General’s Medal in Architecture in 2018.

The office has continued to collaborate with Jodoin Lamarre Pratte architectes for majority of their projects which includes the Raymond-Lévesque Public Library (2011), Michal and Renata Hornstein Pavilion for Peace, Montreal Museum of Fine Arts (2016) and most recently the Cultural Center of Chambly (2019).

== Founding Partners ==
=== Manon Asselin ===
Born in Quebec city, Canada, Manon Asselin attended the McGill School of Architecture and received a Bachelor of Science in 1990 and a Bachelor of Architecture in 1992. She later returned to McGill University to complete a Masters in History and Theory of Architecture in 2001. During 2005 and 2007, Asselin was a visiting professor at the University of Montreal's School of Architecture and later joined the faculty in 2008, where she has taught studios on construction, culture, materiality, and architectural pedagogy.

Manon Asselin is also a member of the Canadian Council for the Arts, Ministry of Culture and Communications of Quebec, and the Ordre des architectes du Québec.

Additionally, Asselin is currently a member and a registered architect under the Quebec Association of Architects as well as a member of the Royal Architectural Institute of Canada.

=== Katsuhiro Yamazaki ===
Katsuhiro Yamazaki was born in San José, Costa Rica to Japanese parents. Yamakazi received a Bachelor of Science and a Bachelor of Architecture from McGill University, in 1994 and 1996 respectively. In 2007, Yamazaki led a Master's studio, with Asselin, focusing on material research at McGill University and has been a visiting professor there since.

== Notable Projects ==
=== Châteauguay Municipal Library (2001 — 2003) ===
Located in the Honor-Mercier park of the city, the Châteauguay Municipal Library was built in Châteauguay, Quebec, after an open competition in 2001. Designed by Atelier TAG in collaboration with JLP architectes, the library houses over 150,000 documents that serve the southern suburb of Montreal. Standing as a “stone cabinet book” against the surrounding natural context, the building is tied with the city’s heritage. he stone clad building resting within the park connects seamlessly to nature, as seen in the roof garden’s connection to a “grassy slope”. Inside, a large staircase occupies much of the lobby space and connects up to the second floor through a double-height space. Situated on the second and third floors are the library's collections, with breathing rooms programmed as work rooms and reading spaces that provide views to the natural landscape outside.

This project was awarded the CICA Excellence Award in 2004, the Award of Excellence from the Ordre des architectes du Québec in 2005 and the distinguished Governor General of Canada Medal in Architecture in 2006.

=== Raymond-Lévesque Public Library (2008 — 2011) ===
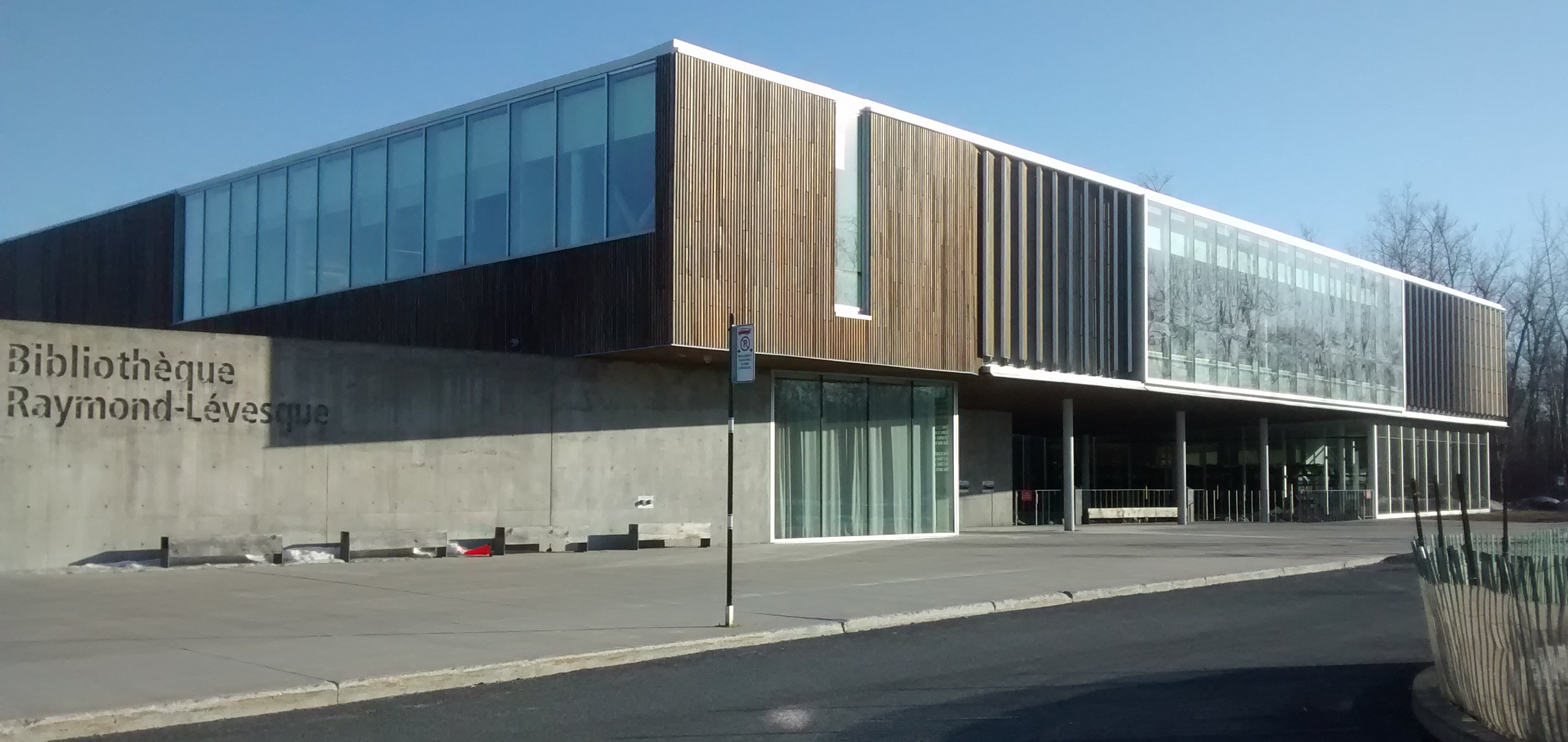
Raymond-Lévesque Public Library, Saint-Hubert, Quebec, 2010

The Raymond-Lévesque Public Library is located in Saint-Hubert, Quebec. This project was designed in collaboration with JLP architectes, and was selected after an open competition was held in 2008. A limited palette consisting of concrete and timber was used on the exterior to mask the use of colour which animates the several spaces within the building. Originating from a notion to re-imagine the conventional image of a library, the concept of the design was to create a form unique to its site. Passive solar energy and passive geothermal energy are some of the many sustainable strategies that were introduced in the realization of the design. The inner courtyard of the building “forms the geographic, social and perceptual heart of the library”. The library is a space for education, and also “intergenerational exchanges” within the surrounding community. Complex geometries are featured all throughout the building creating public spaces with rich views to the forest adjacent to the site.

The project was awarded with several distinctions such as the Canadian Green Building Award in 2012, Ordre des Architectes du Québec Award of Excellence for institutional architecture in 2013 and the Governor General's Medal for Excellence in Architecture in 2014.

=== Michal and Renata Hornstein Pavilion for Peace, Montreal Museum of Fine Arts (2013 — 2016) ===
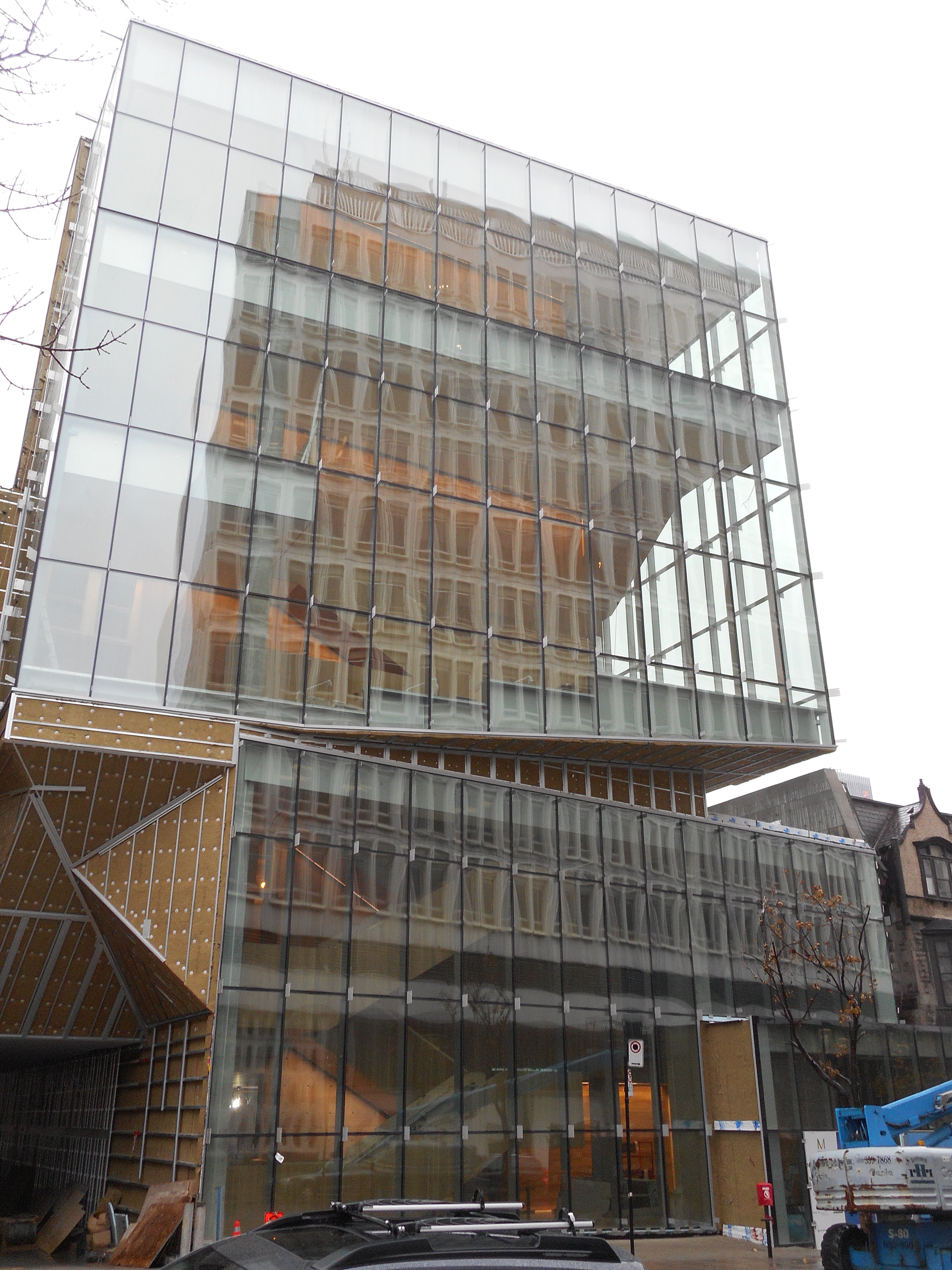
Michal and Renata Hornstein Pavilion for Peace (during construction), Montreal, Quebec, 2016

The Michal and Renata Hornstein Pavilion for Peace is the fifth and most recent wing of the Montreal Museum of Fine Arts. The design by TAG and JLP architectes was selected after an open competition which was held in 2013. As a redefinition of the contemporary museum building, the new wing was opened to the public in November 2016. Built on a compact floor plate, the building stands on the former site of two Victorian houses, both demolished for its construction. The building is split into two programs across 5 floors, with spaces for art therapy and education on the lower 2 levels and gallery space for the international collection of the museum housed on the upper 3 floors.

Several bands of aluminum mullions run across the building’s facade, encasing the fully glazed portions of the exterior and creating a lantern-like mass effect at night. The interior of the open faced museum pavilion is lush with wood panels on the walls and the event stairway, which complement the metal cladding and stand out during the night. Two slightly twisted masses make up the overall form of the structure which visually levitate above the streetscape.

The project has received several awards including the Governor General's Medal for Excellence in Architecture in 2018 and the Canadian Architect Award of Excellence in 2013.

== Selected Projects ==
=== Completed Projects (Designed in consortium with Jodoin Lamarre Pratte Architectes) ===
- 2003: Châteauguay Municipal Library, Châteauguay, Québec, Canada
- 2004: Théâtre du Vieux-Terrebonne, Montreal, Quebec, Canada
- 2011: Raymond-Lévesque Public Library, Saint-Hubert, Quebec, Canada
- 2016: Renovation of the Wilfrid-Pelletier Performance Hall, Montreal, Quebec, Canada
- 2016: Michal and Renata Hornstein Pavilion for Peace, Montreal Museum of Fine Arts, Montreal, Quebec, Canada
- 2017: Gilles-Vigneault Performance Hall, Saint-Jérôme, Quebec, Canada
- 2018: Business Development Bank of Canada Head Office Renovation, Montreal, Quebec, Canada
- 2019: Cultural Center of Chambly - Chambly, Quebec, Canada

==== Other Completed Projects ====
- 2014: Pierre Elliott Trudeau Foundation Headquarters, Montreal, Quebec, Canada

=== Ongoing Projects ===
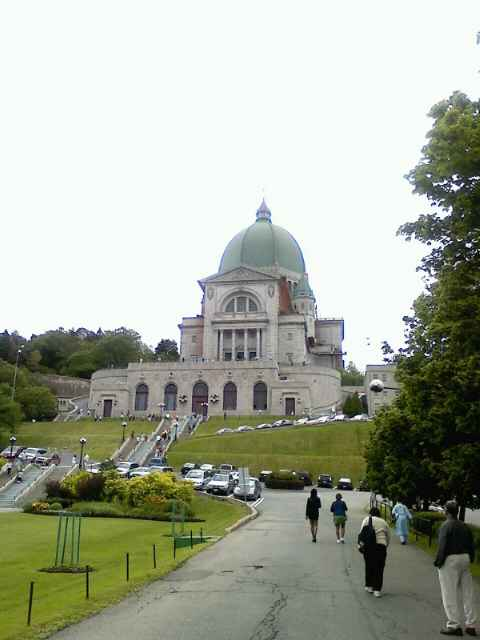
Saint Joseph's Oratory, Montreal, Quebec

- Oratory Basilica, Saint Joseph’s Oratory of Mount Royal, Montreal, Quebec, Canada (Designed in consortium with Architecture49)
- Plateau Library, Gatineau, Quebec, Canada (Designed in consortium with NEUF architect(e)s)

== Awards ==
- Award of Excellence, Ordre des architectes du Québec, 2005
- Governor General’s Medal in Architecture, Royal Architectural Institute of Canada, in consortium with Jodoin Lamarre Pratte architectes, 2006
- Prix de Rome, Canadian Council for the Arts, 2008
- Grands Prix du Design, 2011
- Emerging Voices Award, The Architectural League of New York, 2012
- Award of Excellence, Ordre des architectes du Québec, 2013
- Award of Excellence, Canadian Architect, 2013
- International Iakov Chernikow Prize, 2013
- Award of Excellence, Canadian Architect, 2014
- Governor General’s Medal in Architecture, Royal Architectural Institute of Canada, in consortium with Jodoin Lamarre Pratte architectes, 2014
- Grands Prix du Design for La Foundation Pierre Elliott Trudeau, 2015
- Pôle du savoir, d’histoire et de la culture, in consortium with Jodoin Lamarre Pratte architectes, 2016
- Award of Excellence, Ordre des architectes du Québec, 2017
- Award of Excellence, CISC-ICCA, 2017
- Grands Prix du génie-conseil québécois, Association des firmes de génie-conseil, in consortium with Jodoin Lamarre Pratte architectes, 2018
- Governor General’s Medal in Architecture, Royal Architectural Institute of Canada, in consortium with Jodoin Lamarre Pratte architectes, 2018
- Award of Excellence, Canadian Architect, in consortium with Architecture49, 2018
- Award of Excellence, Cecobois, for Théâtre Gilles-Vigneault, in consortium with Jodoin Lamarre Pratte architectes, 2019

== See also ==
- Architecture of Canada
- Architecture of Montreal
