= The Cost of Love =

- Theatrical release poster
- Directed by: Carl Medland
- Written by: Carl Medland
- Produced by: Carl Medland
- Starring: Christopher Kelham; Caroline Burns Cooke; Mandeesh Gill; Michael Joyce; Valmike Rampersad; Israel Cassol
- Cinematography: Amarjeet Singh
- Edited by: Amarjeet Singh
- Music by: Ram Khatabakhsh
- Distributed by: Peccadillo Pictures
- Release date: 24 April 2010 (East End Film Festival)
- Running time: 85 minutes
- Country: United Kingdom
- Language: English

The Cost of Love is a 2010 gay-themed film by Carl Medland, his debut long feature released by Discovery Films UK. It was shot in Greenwich area in London starring Christopher Kelham as Dale. The film shows diverse characters and the price they pay for falling in love.

The Cost of Love was an Official Selection for End of Pier International Film Festival in 2010 and the festival's closing number. It was screened in 2010 at the East End Film Festival where it was nominated for "Best UK Debut Feature".

== Plot ==
Told mostly in first person, it is the story of Dale (Christopher Kelham), in which reality and fantasy intermingle so that the viewer is left to wonder at all times if a scene (or all scenes) are actual or Dale's imagination.

Dale is a hustler who from the onset of the film says he likes engaging in all forms of sex, including S&M. He spends his days cruising parks and saunas for casual sex or prostituting to high-paying clients. Upfront with his sexuality and his hustling, Dale's hard exterior hides his very fragile shattered interior. He has developed a rampant imagination and fantasies of his own that he resorts to in many situations he is in.

Dale has longed for his best friend since childhood, the "straight" Raj (Valmike Rampersad) and has developed very romantic feelings towards him. Dale is shocked when Raj asks him to become his best man at a hastily arranged wedding with Veena (Mandeesh Gill), a children's teacher. But there is more to it, since it turns out she is terminally ill and has only a few months to live.

Besides Raj, the other main character is Sean (Michael Joyce, also known in gay scene as the drag artist Estee Applauder) who is Dale's confidant and has an obvious crush on him. Sean has to deal with Christine (Caroline Burns Cooke). There is also Ricardo (Israel Cassol) who is a Brazilian hunk escort, friend of Dale, and a partner in many of his hustling acts. Pete (Robert Gray) is another character who has to come to terms with his sexuality through his involvement with Dale in a series of role-playing abusive relationship. Secrets are revealed when a stranger, Richard (Frank Jakeman), starts frequenting a bar where Sean is performing and makes approaches to reveal deep family secrets.

Homophobia is there with the murder of a young gay man on the Heath, a notable night-time cruising ground in London. Viewers are kept guessing whether this is actually Ricardo or some unknown character as Dale and Sean visit the site to put some flowers. This is also the prelude for a (real or imagined) fantasy scene where Dale is being murdered during an S&M act while he is fantasizing every detail of the gruesome torture and murder. And in a dreamlike "funeral scene", all the grieving characters are present in the church to "mourn" Dale's loss, while Dale is commenting on their lives after his departure, while they are reminiscing on the impact Dale had on all their lives.

== Cast ==
- Christopher Kelham as Dale
- Michael Joyce as Sean
- Valmike Rampersad as Raj
- Mandeesh Gill as Veena
- Caroline Burns Cooke as Christine
- Jan Hirst as Marian
- Israel Cassol as Ricardo
- Arin Alldridge as Andy
- Robert Gray as Pete
- Darren Petrucci as Dominic
- Carl Medland as Dale's father
- Frank Jakeman as Richard

(Others in alphabetical order)

- Chris Bowe as Sauna boy
- Cairns Richard Brett as Cruising man
- Kylie Cobley as Veena's friend
- Elizabeth Cooper as Waitress
- Joanna Croll as Nurse
- Jared Davies as Clubber
- Robert Emmanuel as Bully
- Gary Fakes as Schoolboy escort
- Neil Kelly as Mike
- Dominic Kemp as Sauna boy 2
- Steve Milne as TV presenter
- Stephanie Thompson as Mum in park
