= Hilary Sample =

American architect

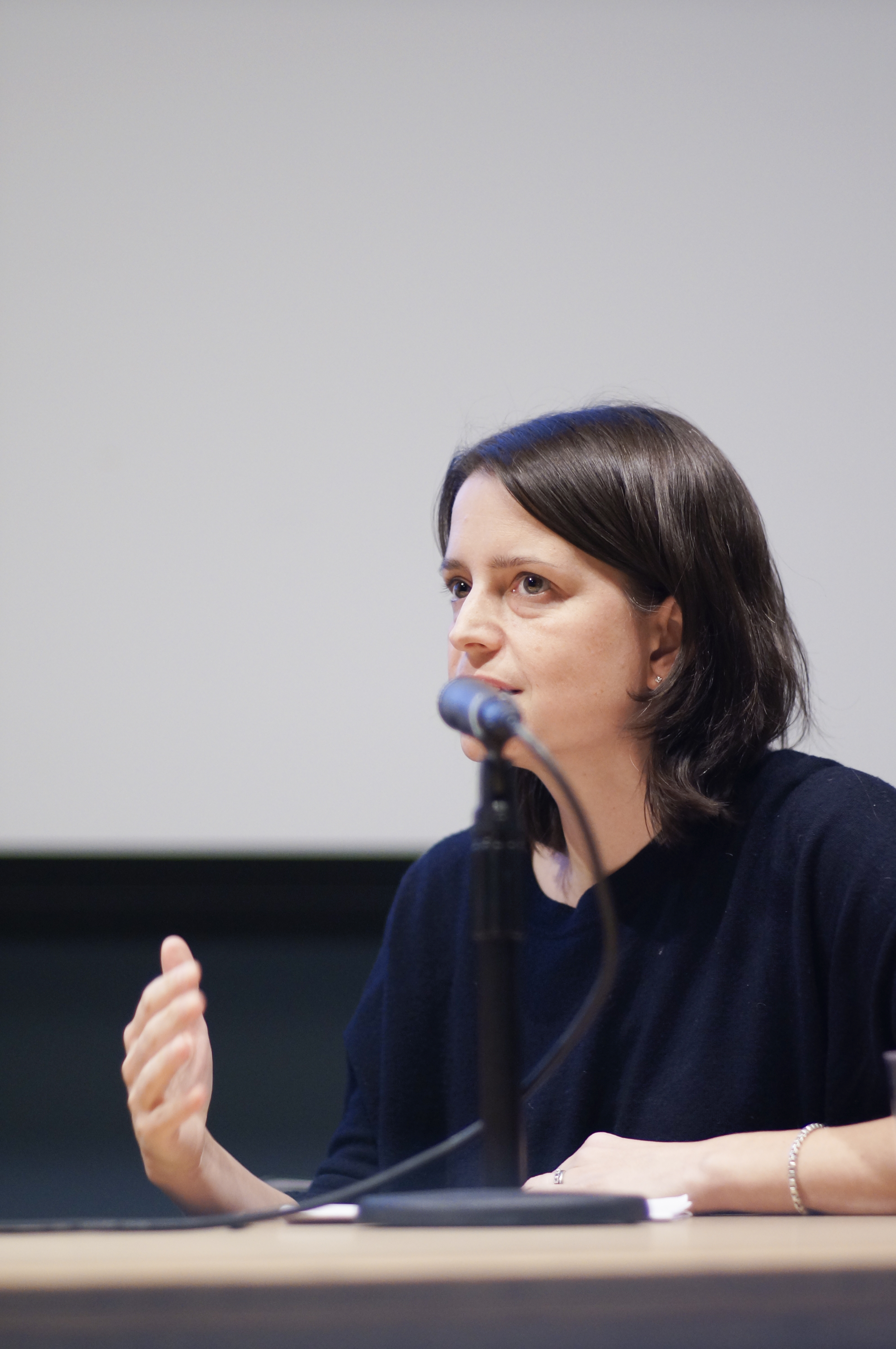
Image of Hilary Sample

Hilary Sample is an American architect, principal, and co-founder of the award-winning architecture firm MOS Architects in New York City.

== Education ==
Sample received a Master of Architecture with distinction from Princeton University (2003) and a Bachelor of Architecture from Syracuse University (1994).

== Professional life ==
With partner Michael Meredith (architect), Sample founded MOS Architects in 2003. The New York-based firm is a small architectural practice that works on a range of projects that interconnect architectural practice, academia, and the arts through playful experimentation and inventive material usage. MOS’s work spans buildings, exhibitions, installations, furniture, objects, software, video and publications, and is characterized by a critical reflection on architecture itself, often addressing questions of architectural representation, scale, domesticity, and use.

MOS has designed and curated exhibitions for a variety of art- and architecture-based work, such as The Other Architect at the Canadian Centre for Architecture (2015), 44 Low-resolution Houses (2018) and Building with Writing (2025) at Princeton University, and A Garden of… at Marta Gallery (2025). The practice has also collaborated with artists such as Tony Cokes, Pierre Huyghe, Rachel Rose (artist), and Tobias Putrih. Meredith and Sample have been invited to display their work in galleries and institutions across the United States, Europe, and Asia, including for Foreclosed: Rehousing the American Dream at the Museum of Modern Art (2012), the Chicago Architecture Biennial, and the Venice Architecture Biennale on multiple occasions. Their works are held in the permanent collections of the Museum of Modern Art, Art Institute of Chicago, Carnegie Museum of Art, Yale University Art Gallery, and the Canadian Centre for Architecture.

The firm’s built works primarily includes single-family housing, collective housing, artist studios, and cultural and educational projects. Notable projects include four studio buildings for the Krabbesholm Højskole campus in Denmark, the Museum of Outdoor Arts Element House visitor center in Colorado, Studio No. 3 and House No. 10 in New York, the Floating House on Lake Huron, and the Lali Gurans Orphanage and Learning Center in Kathmandu, Nepal. Their work has also engaged social housing, beginning with their Foreclosed: Rehousing the American Dream exhibition at the MoMA and continuing through projects such as Laboratorio de Vivienda and Barrio Chacarita Alta Housing.

== Academic life ==
Sample is the associate professor at Columbia Graduate School of Architecture, Planning and Preservation. Prior to joining Columbia University, Sample taught at Yale University, University at Buffalo, where she was awarded the Reyner Banham Teaching Fellowship, and the University of Toronto. In 2015, Sample and Meredith served as the Fitzhugh Scott MasterCrit Chairs in Design Excellence at UW Milwaukee School of Architecture and Urban Planning

Sample was a visiting scholar at the Canadian Centre for Architecture. Her writings have been published in Harvard Design Magazine, Log, Praxis, and Metropolis. Her research focuses on the intersection of architecture, health, environments, technology, and design.

== Publications ==
Publishing forms a significant component of MOS’s work. The firm produces books that document projects and exhibitions and present research-based and speculative work related to architecture, housing, public space, and pedagogy. Selected publications include:

- 2012 Everything All at Once: The Software, Architecture, and Videos of MOS, Michael Meredith and Hilary Sample, Princeton Architectural Press
- 2012 Matter: Material Processes in Architectural Production, edited by Gail Peter Borden and Michael Meredith, Routledge
- 2015 MOS: Selected Works, Michael Meredith and Hilary Sample, Princeton Architectural Press
- 2015 Questions Concerning Health: Stress and Wellness in Johannesburg, edited by Hilary Sample, Columbia University, Graduate School of Architecture Planning and Preservation
- 2016 A Situation Constructed from Loose and Overlapping Social and Architectural Aggregates, Michael Meredith, Hilary Sample & MOS, AADR
- 2016 Maintenance Architecture, Hilary Sample, The MIT Press
- 2018 44 Low-resolution Houses, Michael Meredith, Princeton Architectural Press
- 2018 An Unfinished ... Encyclopedia of ... Scale Figures Without ... Architecture, edited by Michael Meredith, Hilary Sample & MOS, The MIT Press
- 2019 A Constant Search for Architecture: Michael Meredith and Hilary Sample on a Curious Journey, essay by Michael Meredith and Hilary Sample, Canadian Centre for Architecture
- 2019 Houses for Sale, Michael Meredith and Hilary Sample, Canadian Centre for Architecture and Corraini Edizioni
- 2021 Vacant Spaces, NY, Michael Meredith Hilary Sample & MOS, Actar
- 2023 A Book on Making a Petite Ecole, Michael Meredith and Hilary Sample, Actar
- 2025 Public Spaces, NY, Michael Meredith, Hilary Sample & MOS, University of Chicago Press
- 2025 Smaller Architecture, Michael Meredith, Architectural Exchange

== Awards ==
MOS Architects has received numerous awards and recognitions, including:

- Architectural League of New York Emerging Voices Award (2008)
- MoMA PS1 Young Architects Program (2009)
- American Academy of Arts and Letters Academy Award in Architecture (2010)
- National Endowment for the Arts Our Town Grant (2011)
- Holcim Foundation Awards for Sustainable Construction (2014, 2025)
- Cooper Hewitt, Smithsonian Design Museum National Design Award in Architecture (2015)
- United States Artists Fellowship in Architecture and Design (2020)
- A+D Museum Design Award for Housing No. 8 (2021)
- Arnold W. Brunner / Katherine Edwards Gordon Rome Prize, American Academy in Rome (2022–2023)
- Election to the National Academy of Design (2025)
