= Höweler+Yoon =

American architecture and design firm

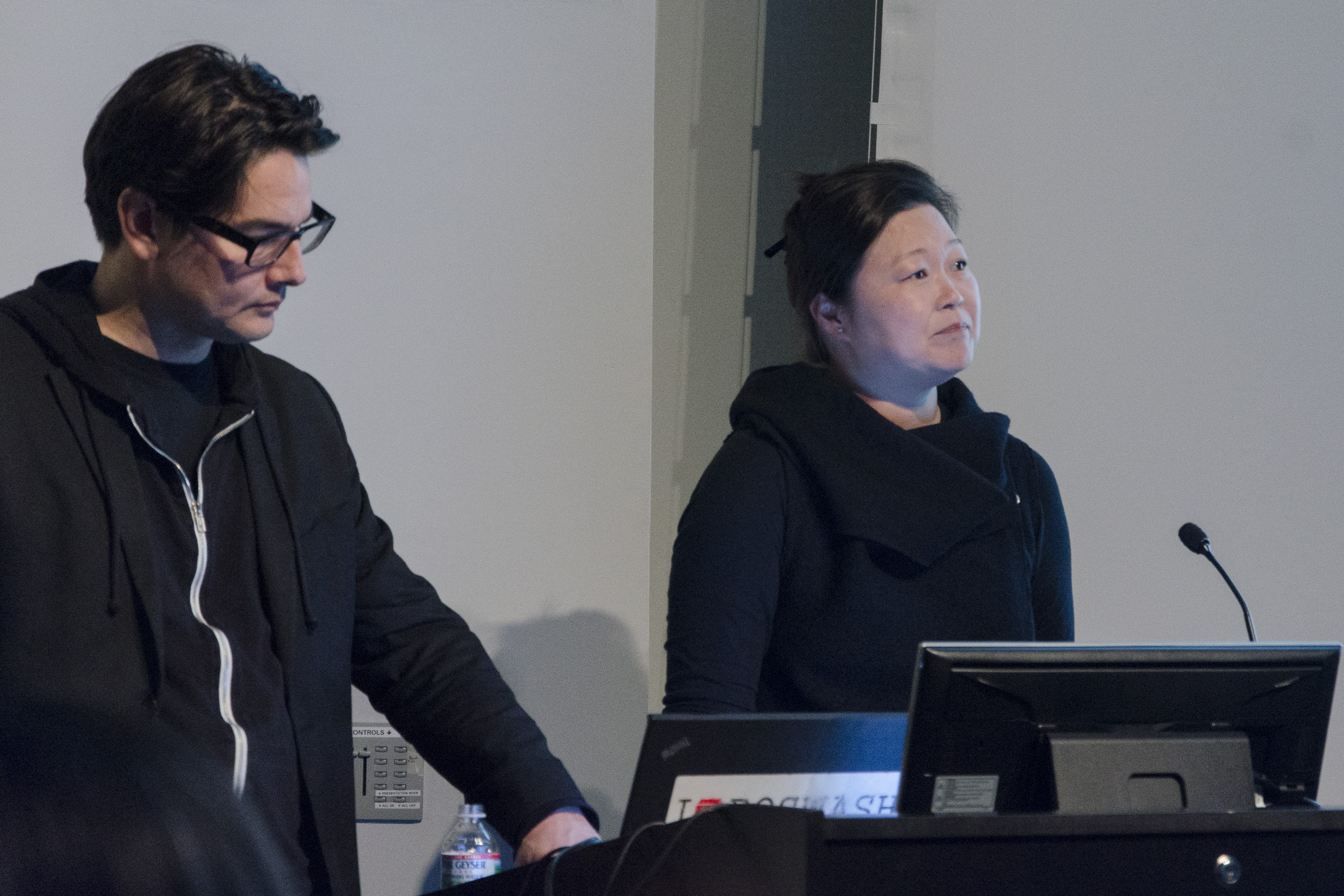
Eric Höweler and Meejin Yoon present the work of their multidisciplinary practice, “operating in the space between architecture, art, and landscape,” and their conviction in “an embodied experience of architecture, seeing media as material and its effects as palpable elements of architectural speculation.” Photographed by Ranitri Weerasuriya in 2015.

Höweler+Yoon (HYA) is a design-driven architecture practice and creative studio based in Boston, Massachusetts. It was founded in 2004 by Eric Höweler and Meejin Yoon.

Yoon and Höweler first met while studying Architecture at Cornell University in 1990. They married in 2002 and founded Höweler+Yoon Architecture two years later.

== Recent projects ==
In 2020, HYA completed the Memorial to Enslaved Laborers at the University of Virginia, a landscape installation dedicated to enslaved laborers. The memorial was spontaneously inaugurated as a gathering place for group and individual contemplation during the national protests against racialized violence in June 2020.

The firm's other work includes the 212 Stuart Street multi-family residential tower (Boston), the MIT Museum (Cambridge, Massachusetts), and Float Lab, a public art installation and floating laboratory on the Schuylkill River (Philadelphia).

== Work ==
Höweler+Yoon's projects range from cultural and institutional buildings, mixed-use residential and commercial buildings, to public spaces, interactive environments, and research projects. Höweler+Yoon are known for work informed by human experience and a sensitivity to tectonics.

In 2003, the firm was commissioned to design an interactive public art piece for the Athens 2004 Summer Olympics. They went on to design the Boston Society of Architects Headquarters, the Sean Collier Memorial at MIT, Sky Courts Exhibition Hall (Chengdu, China), and Swing Time. They are known for working across the domains of architecture, urban design, public space, immersive experience, and design strategy.

== Awards ==
In 2012, Höweler+Yoon won the Audi Urban Future Award. Other notable awards include United States Artists Award in Architecture and Design in 2008, Architectural Record’s Design Vanguard Award in 2007, the Architecture League of New York’s Emerging Voices Award in 2007, and the Rome Prize in Design in 2005.

HYA has won the BSA Honor Award (2015) for the Collier Memorial, as well as the AIA Small Project Award (2018) for the project "Shadow Play". In 2020, Höweler+Yoon was the winner of the NOMA/NAACP Seed Award and the AIA New England Honor Award for their UVA Memorial to Enslaved Laborers.

== Publications ==
- Yoon, J. Meejin; Höweler, Eric (2021). Verify in field : projects and conversations : Höweler + Yoon. Zurich: Park Books. ISBN 978-3038602248.
- Yoon, J. Meejin; Höweler, Eric (2009). Expanded practice : Höweler + Yoon Architecture / My Studio (1st ed.). New York, NY: Princeton Architectural Press. ISBN 978-1568988665.
- Yoon, J. Meejin; Miller, Meredith (2008). Public works : unsolicited small projects for the Big Dig. Hong Kong: MAP Book Publishers. ISBN 978-9881771216.
