= Eric Höweler =

Chinese-Dutch architect

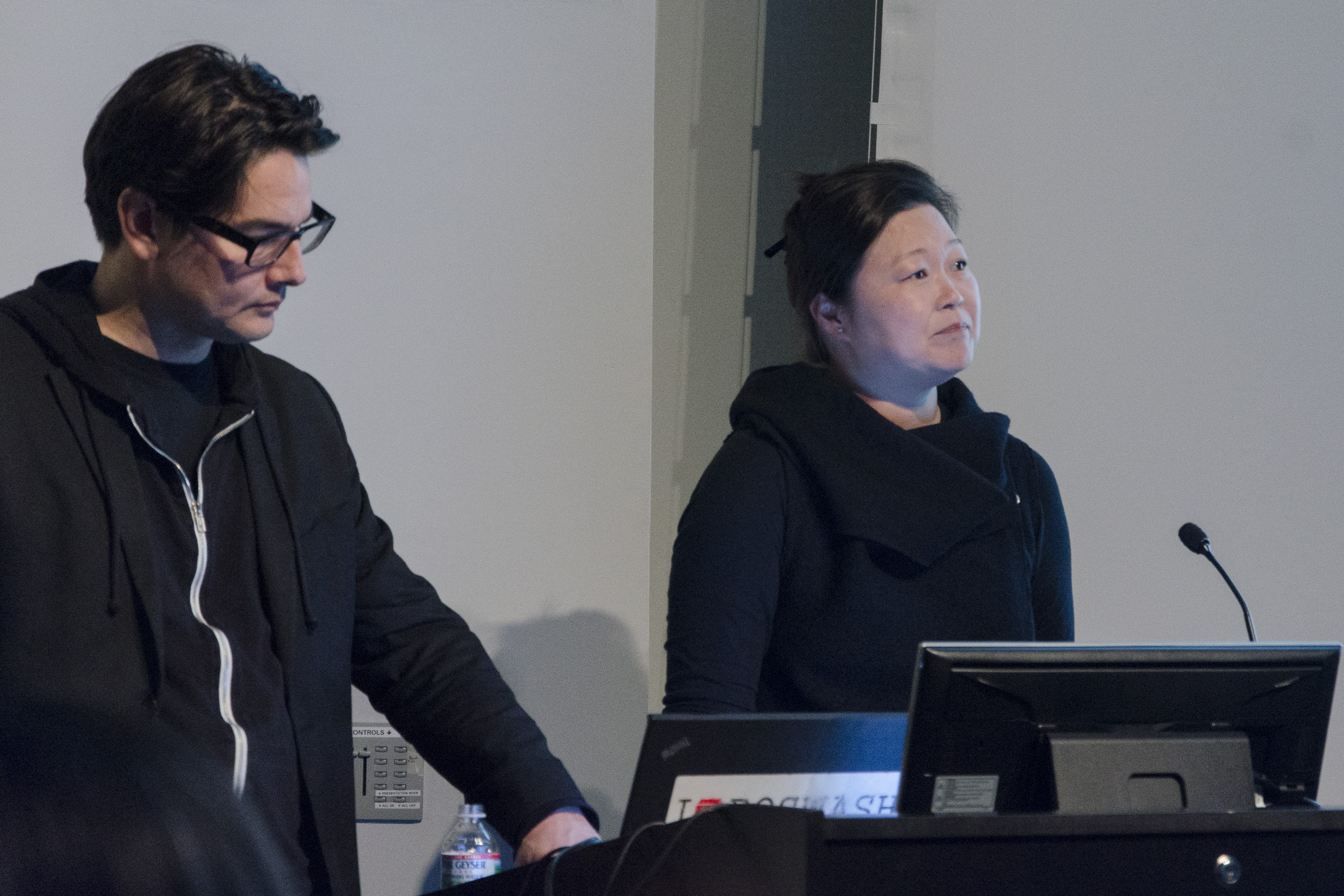
Eric Höweler and Meejin Yoon on 2015.

Eric Höweler (born 1972) is a Chinese-Dutch architect and designer. Höweler is Professor of Architecture at the Harvard University Graduate School of Design, where he teaches lecture courses and design studios with a focus on building technologies/integration since 2008. In 2004, Höweler founded Höweler+Yoon Architecture with partner Meejin Yoon.

== Education and early career ==
Höweler was born in Cali, Colombia, and studied architecture at Cornell University, where he received both his Bachelor of Architecture and Master of Architecture. From 1996 to 2003 Höweler worked at Kohn Pedersen Fox, and Diller+Scofidio (now Diller Scofidio + Renfro).

== Professional work ==
Höweler established Höweler+Yoon Architecture in 2004 with partner Meejin Yoon. The firm is an international interdisciplinary design practice working across the domains of architecture, urban design, public space, immersive experience, and design strategy. Höweler + Yoon Architecture is based out of Boston, Massachusetts. Notable works include the MIT Museum at the Massachusetts Institute of Technology (Cambridge, Massachusetts), the Memorial to Enslaved Laborers at the University of Virginia (Charlottesville, Virginia), the Living Village residence hall at the Yale Divinity School (New Haven, Connecticut), Sky Courts Exhibition Hall (Chengdu, China), the MIT Collier Memorial (Cambridge, Massachusetts) and the Boston Society of Architects Headquarters (Boston).

== Academic work ==
Höweler is Professor of Architecture at the Harvard Graduate School of Design. Höweler is the author of Design for Construction: Tectonic Imagination in Contemporary Architecture (Routledge, 2025); Verify in Field (with Meejin Yoon, Park Books 2022); Expanded Practice (with Meejin Yoon, Princeton Architectural Press, 2009); Skyscraper: Vertical Now (Rizzoli/Universe Publishers, 2003), Public Works, Unsolicited Small Projects for the Big Dig (with Meejin Yoon and Meredith Miller, MAP Book Publishers, 2009) and 1001 Skyscrapers (with Meejin Yoon, Princeton Architectural Press, 2000). Höweler has published essays and articles in Perspecta, Archis, Thresholds, Log, Architectural Record, The Architect’s Newspaper, Architectural Lighting, and Praxis.

== Awards ==
Höweler's work has received numerous notable design awards, including the Audi Urban Future Award in 2012, United States Artists Award in Architecture and Design in 2008, and Architectural Record’s Design Vanguard Award in 2007.
