= John Friedman Alice Kimm Architects =

John Friedman Alice Kimm Architects (JFAK)

Practice information
- Firm type: Architecture
- Key architects: Alice Kimm, FAIA, LEED AP B+C, John Friedman, FAIA
- Founded: 1996
- Location: Los Angeles, CA

Significant works and honors
- Projects: La Kretz Innovation Campus, Claremont McKenna College Roberts Pavilion, The Resnick Institute + JCAP

Website
- http://www.jfak.net

John Friedman Alice Kimm Architects (JFAK) is an American architecture firm founded in 1996 in Los Angeles, California USA.

== History ==
JFAK's architectural practice was founded by husband-and-wife team, John Friedman and Alice Kimm.

Friedman has a B.S. in Architecture from the Massachusetts Institute of Technology (MIT) and a Master of Architecture from Harvard University. He also earned a Master of Arts degree in Philosophy, Politics, and Economics from Oxford University, where he was California’s Newton Tatum Scholar.

Kimm was born and raised in Chicago and spent her high school years in Seoul. Kimm has a Bachelor of Arts in Economics from Cornell University and a Master of Architecture from Harvard University.

JFAK's work has been widely recognized. They received a Responsible Disruptors Award from Metropolis Magazine in 2022 for their Open Source Homelessness Initiative (OSHI). In 2004, Friedman and Kimm were named Architectural League Emerging Voices by the Architectural League of New York. Their work has been noted in The Los Angeles Times, The Architect's Newspaper, LAist, Curbed LA, and Arch Daily.

== Notable projects ==
In 2021, JFAK opened the Navig8 Council District 8 Homeless Navigation Center, which has proven indispensable to the local community. That same year, they contributed a public art project, Listen In, to the United Way of Greater LA. In 2016, JFAK completed a 144,000 square-foot collegiate recreation facility, the Roberts Pavilion, at Claremont McKenna College, as well as the La Kretz Innovation Campus (LKIC), a 3.2-acre campus located in a former furniture and fabric warehouse in the Los Angeles’ Arts District for entrepreneurs, engineers, and policymakers to innovate and support LA’s green economy. The building of the LA Cleantech Incubator (LACI) is an adaptive reuse of a 61,000 square-foot warehouse that includes Los Angeles Department of Water and Power (LADWP) facilities, offices, conference rooms, labs, prototyping workshops, and an event space. The project has been published in Metropolis Magazine, Wallpaper, and Dezeen.
