= Prix de Rome (disambiguation) =

"Prix de Rome" may refer to:

- Prix de Rome of the French government
- Prix de Rome (Belgium)
- Prix de Rome (Canada)
- Prix de Rome (Netherlands)
- Rome Prize of the American Academy in Rome
- Rome Scholarship of the British School at Rome
