= Darren Petrucci =

American architect and urban designer

Darren Petrucci is an American architect, educator, and urban designer known for implementing the concept of amenity infrastructure. He is the Suncor Professor at Arizona State University’s (ASU) Design School, where he served as Founding Director from 2005 to 2012, and the principal of A-I-R (Architecture-Infrastructure-Research) Inc.

He has received the Progressive Architecture Award, the AIA Award, Architectural League Emerging Voices, and two NCARB Awards.

His work has been featured in Metropolis, Places Journal, Architect Magazine, and Sprawl, as well as in Public Space, published by the National Endowment for the Arts in collaboration with Princeton Architectural Press, and Re-Envisioning Landscape/Architecture, published by Actar Press. His projects have been exhibited in Barcelona, Phoenix, New York, and at the Scottsdale Museum of Contemporary Art.

== Biography ==
He was born in New Jersey and grew up in Colorado. Petrucci’s early introduction with nature and spatial design stemmed from childhood explorations in Colorado’s landscapes and living in a 16-foot-wide, 7-level mountainside condominium. Initially pursuing pre-med studies at Tulane University, he shifted to architecture, later earning a Bachelor of Science in Design from ASU in 1990 with honors. He completed dual master’s degrees at Harvard Graduate School of Design: a Master of Architecture (MArch) and a Master of Architecture and Urban Design (MAUD) in 1996, both awarded with distinction. He is also the 1996 recipient of Harvard's Peter Rice Prize.

His graduate thesis introduced amenity infrastructure inspired by Scottsdale's Indian Bend Wash—a flood-management system transformed into a network of public parks.

== Career ==
Petrucci’s career spans academia and practice. At ASU, he served as Director of The Design School (2005–2012), where he unified design disciplines and established the Master of Urban Design (MUD) program. During his tenure as Director, the Architecture Program received its highest National ranking in the history of the School. As a professor, he founded SCAPE (Systems Components Architectural Products + Environments), a research lab exploring sustainable design solutions. He holds affiliate roles in ASU’s Biomimicry Center and School for the Future of Innovation in Society and is a Senior Sustainability Scientist at the Global Institute of Sustainability.

In 2001, he launched A-I-R Inc., a firm bridging architecture, infrastructure, and research. In 2019, he founded the nonprofit FA-I-RTRADE, creating cost-effective, sustainable structures for underserved communities in Cape Town and Nepal.

Petrucci’s teaching focused on life-centered design, shifting focus from human-centric to ecological solutions. He co-created COLĪD (Center of Life-Inspired Design), a transdisciplinary studio tackling issues like coral reef restoration. His studios have partnered with Hawaii Green Growth, the Galapagos Islands, and Nepal’s Sherpa communities.

In 2011, Petrucci delivered a TEDx Talk in Scottsdale, Arizona, discussing various aspects of architecture and design.

== Architectural work and style ==
In 2006, Darren Petrucci designed the VH R-10 gHouse in Martha’s Vineyard, Massachusetts. He incorporates Brise-soleil sunshades and modular construction methods, focusing on passive solar heating and cooling. The project won the Architectural Record's Record House Award in 2008 and was featured in the book Martha’s Vineyard: Contemporary Living (2010).

In 2017, He collaborated with Hawaii Green Growth on the Ala Wai Watershed Rehabilitation project, which focuses on restoring Honolulu's Ala Wai River corridor.

In 2019, Petrucci designed the Nepal Orphanage through his FA-I-RTRADE initiative as a modular building to provide housing for Sherpa children in Khandbari, Nepal. Petrucci developed the Smithsonian Tropical Research Station as a low-impact research facility prototype, funded by a $15,000 grant from the Smithsonian. His project emphasizes ecological preservation and aims to provide a sustainable research environment on Coiba Island, Panama.

In 2017, Petrucci completed the Ghost Wash House in Paradise Valley, Arizona, a 9,000-square-foot residential project that integrates ecological functionality with desert aesthetics. His design features a central artificial wash that mimics natural desert arroyos, incorporating brick patterns and a floating canopy to regulate microclimates within the house. The American Institute of Architects (AIA) recognized the project as U.S. residential designs of 2018 and received the Arizona Masonry Guild's Golden Trowel Award.

Petrucci’s urban design work includes Stripscape (Phoenix, Arizona, 2004–2008), a streetscape revitalization project along 7th Avenue that involved a $1.3 million investment. It earned the NCARB Prize for its integration of education and practice in urban design.

Petrucci's international and humanitarian work include the Rugby Road Duplex (Cape Town, South Africa, 2017–Present). The duplex incorporates precast concrete molds to harvest rainwater and solar energy.

From 2013 to 2015, Petrucci worked on Buckeye Bands (Buckeye, Arizona), an urban plan developed in collaboration with the White Tank Mountain Conservancy.

Petrucci's work includes the Copper Canyon House, a desert home located at the base of Camelback Mountain near Phoenix. Petrucci’s approach to architecture focuses on creating spaces that connect inhabitants closely to nature, with the Copper Canyon House described as a desert dwelling that feels like camping in nature.

== Selected awards ==
- Record House Award for VH R-10g House (2008)
- Architectural League Emerging Voices (2009)
- Progressive Architecture Award for GLUE: Generic Landscapes Urban Environments (2002)
- NCARB Prize (2002, 2008).
- AIA National Residential Design Honor Award for Ghost Wash House (2018)
