= Christopher Kelham =

British film actor and producer

Christopher Kelham is a British film actor and producer best known for his lead role as Dale in the 2010 film The Cost of Love.

== Filmography ==
- 2001: Representative Radio as Ben
- 2004: Fakers as Tim
- 2005: What's Your Name 41? as Carlos Santini
- 2009: Trial & Retribution as a reporter (in 1 episode - "Siren Part1 " -- TV series)
- 2011: The Cost of Love as Dale
- 2011: Hustle as hotel manager (in 1 episode "Old Sparks Come New"—TV series)
