= Kevin Lippert =

American publisher, founder of Princeton Architectural Press

Kevin Christopher Lippert (January 20, 1959 – March 29, 2022) was an American book publisher. He was the founder of Princeton Architectural Press.

== Early life and education ==
Lippert was born in Leeds, England to Ernest and Maureen (Ellis) Lippert. He was born while they were studying at the University of Leeds.

In 1980, he received a BA from Princeton University and a MA in 1983.

During his time as a student, he was the music director of the Princeton radio station WPRB.

== Career ==
At Princeton in 1981, when Lippert was a graduate student in architecture, he realized that there was a demand for reprints of important books that students were encouraged to study. The original editions were large, old, and often hard to access. He received permission from Princeton librarians to copy books, the first being Recueil et Parallèle des Edifices de Tout Genre by French architect Jean-Nicolas-Louis Durand published in 1800. The edition published by Lippert turned out to be too expensive and too large for student use. The next book, the three volume Edifices de Rome Moderne published by Paul Letarouilly in 1840, was printed in a small one volume book. He had 1,000 copies printed and sold them out of the trunk of his car. He founded Princeton Architectural Press (PAP) soon after. In 1996, PAP made a distribution agreement with Chronicle Books. In 1997, Lippert sold Springer Verlag, the owner of the architectural publisher Birkhauser, a share of the company.

Lippert was central in publishing Steven Holl’s 1989 manifesto Anchoring, which is considered one of the “fundamental design texts of the past half-century”.

He authored the 2015 book War Plan Red on War Plan Red, the United States plan for a hypothetical war with the British Empire.

== Awards and honors ==
In 2020, Lippert received an award in architecture from the American Academy of Arts and Letters.

== Personal life ==
Lippert died on March 29, 2022, at his home in Ghent, New York. He died due to complications of brain cancer.
