= LTL Architects =

Architecture firm

LTL Architects is an architecture firm founded in 1997 by Paul Lewis, Marc Tsurumaki and David Lewis in New York City.

The firm received a 2007 National Design Award from the Cooper-Hewitt, National Design Museum and was selected as one of six American architectural firms featured in the U.S. Pavilion at the 2004 Venice Architecture Biennale. LTL was included in the 2000 National Design Triennial at the Cooper-Hewitt and was selected in December 2000 by Architectural Record as one of ten firms representing a “Vanguard in Contemporary Architecture.”

== Partner background ==
Paul Lewis (born 1966) received a Bachelor of Arts from Wesleyan University in 1988 and a Master of Architecture from Princeton University School of Architecture in 1992. He is a fellow of the American Academy in Rome and the winner of the 1998-1999 Mercedes T. Bass Rome Prize in Architecture. He is an assistant professor and director of graduate studies at Princeton University School of Architecture.

Marc Tsurumaki (born 1965) received his Bachelor of Science in architecture from the University of Virginia School of Architecture in 1987 and a Master of Architecture from Princeton University School of Architecture in 1991. He is an adjunct professor of architecture at Columbia Graduate School of Architecture, Planning and Preservation. He was the Fall 2006 Louis I. Kahn Visiting Assistant Professor at Yale University.

David Lewis (born 1966) received a Bachelor of Arts from Carleton College in 1988, a Master of Arts in the history of architecture and urbanism from Cornell University in 1992, and a Master of Architecture from Princeton University School of Architecture in 1995. David is as dean of the school of constructed environments and professor of architecture at Parsons School of Design where he has taught since 2002.

== Select Projects ==
=== Completed ===
- The Contemporary Austin - Jones Center (formerly Arthouse at the Jones Center), Austin, TX (2010)
- Van Alen Institute, New York, NY (1998)
- Bornhuetter Hall, The College of Wooster, Wooster, OH (2004)
- Fluff Bakery, New York, NY (2004)
- Ini Ani Coffee Shop, New York, NY (2004)
- Xing Restaurant, New York, NY (2005). Winner of the James Beard Foundation Award for Outstanding Restaurant Design (2007)
- Glenmore Gardens (Department of Housing Preservation and Development project), Brooklyn, NY (2007)
- Office of Strategic Assessment, Planning and Design, New York University, New York, NY (2007)

=== In Progress ===
- Nazareth House, Nazareth, PA
- Department of Social and Cultural Analysis, New York University, New York, NY
- Villa Ordos, Inner Mongolia (100 international architecture firms selected in 2008 to design 1,000 square meter villas for Ordos 100)
