= Paul Lewis (architect) =

American architect

Paul Lewis is a practicing architect based in New York City. He is a principal of LTL Architects and an assistant professor and director of graduate studies at Princeton University School of Architecture. He also has taught at Barnard and Columbia Colleges, Cooper Union, Ohio State University, and Parsons The New School for Design.

He received a Bachelor of Arts from Wesleyan University (1988) and a Master of Architecture from Princeton University School of Architecture (1992). He is the winner of the 1998–1999 Mercedes T. Bass Rome Prize in Architecture and a fellow of the American Academy in Rome.

In 2018, Paul Lewis was elected the president of the Architectural League of New York.
