= Pablo Castro Estevez =

Argentine architect

Pablo Castro
- Born: October 9, 1959 (age 66); San Juan, Argentina
- Education: Universidad Nacional de San Juan; Columbia Graduate School of Architecture, Planning and Preservation
- Occupation: Architect
- Practice: Obra Architects

Pablo Castro (born October 9, 1959) is an Argentinean-born architect and co-founder of the award-winning architectural design firm Obra Architects in New York City, Beijing, and Seoul.

== Education and early career ==
Born in San Juan, Castro left Argentina in 1989 to move to New York. He holds an Architecture diploma from the Universidad Nacional de San Juan and a MS in Advanced Architectural Design from Columbia University Graduate School of Architecture Planning and Preservation. From 1995 to 2000, Castro served as Senior Associate at Steven Holl Architects, where he was in charge of the design and realization of the award-winning College of Architecture and Landscape Architecture for the University of Minnesota. He spent four months in Helsinki detailing Steven Holl's breakthrough project Kiasma Museum of Contemporary Art which opened to the public in 1998.

== Professional life ==
Together with partner Jennifer Lee, he established Obra Architects in New York City in the year 2000. The firm won the MoMA PS1 Young Architects Program with their project Beatfuse! which opened to the public in the summer of 2006. Projects include Casa Osa, a private residence in Costa Rica, the award-winning Sanhe Kindergarten in Beijing, private residences in Argentina and New York, and Exquisite Corpse, a solo show and installation featuring models and sketches on view at the Architektur Galerie Berlin in September 2016.

== Academic life ==
Castro has taught at RISD, Parsons, and Pratt Institute Graduate Architecture. He was Guest Interim Head of the Architecture Department at Cranbrook Academy of Art in 2005 and the Cass Gilbert Visiting Professor at the University of Minnesota College of Architecture and Landscape Architecture in 1999. He has been an Honorary Professor at Universidad Nacional de San Juan since 2011.

== Awards ==
He is a Fellow of the American Academy in Rome (2012–2013), Winner of the MoMA PS1 Young Architects Program (2006), Architectural League of New York's 2005 Emerging Voices, a New York Foundation for the Arts Fellow, and Society of Architectural Historians de Montëquin Senior Fellow (2005). The work of his firm Obra Architects has won six American Institute of Architects NY Design Awards and two Chicago Athenaeum American Architecture Awards.

== Publications ==
- 2016 Obra Architects Logic, Selected Projects 2003–2016, Publisher Arkitektur B, Copenhagen ISBN 9788792700162
- 2005 Obra Architects monograph, Series of Contemporary Architects Studio Report in the United States, China Architecture & Building Press, United Asia Art & Design Cooperation, Beijing ISBN 7112073944
