= Prix de Rome (Canada) =

Canadian architecture award

The Prix de Rome is an award for architects from the Canada Council for the Arts

Established in 1987, the Prix de Rome is awarded to an architect or group of architects. Two annual awards are made: the Prix de Rome for professional architecture and the Prix de Rome in Architecture for Emerging Practitioners.

From 1987 to 2003, the award included a residency in a John Shnier-designed laureates' apartment in the Trastevere district of Rome. The professional award currently consists of a $50,000 cash award, and the Emerging Practitioner award a $34,000 cash award.

Due to uncertainty about travel restrictions due to the COVID-19 pandemic, the 2020 prizes were postponed to 2021, when two winners were to be selected. In 2022, two Professional awards were given, and three Emerging Practitioners were premiated.

== Recipients ==
=== Professional ===
- 1987 – John Shnier (Inaugural Prix de Rome)
- 1988 – Jacques Rousseau
- 1990 – Sophie Charlebois
- 1991 – Dereck Revington
- 1992 – John McMinn
- 1993 – Hal Ingberg
- 1994 – Anthony Robins
- 1995 – Philip Beesley
- 1996 – Philippe Lupien
- 1997 – Pierre Thibault
- 1998 – Atelier Big City
- 1999 – Peter Yeadon
- 2000 – Jason King & George Yu
- 2001 – Atelier In Situ
- 2002 – Marc Boutin
- 2003 – Andrew King
- 2004 – Michael Carroll & Danita Rooyakkers of Atelier BUILD
- 2005 – Eric Bunge of nARCHITECT
- 2006 – Kobayashi + Zedda Architects Ltd.
- 2007 – Manon Asselin and Katsuhiro Yamazaki of Atelier TAG
- 2008 – Pierre Bélanger
- 2009 – RVTR
- 2010 – Lola Shepard & Mason White of Lateral Office
- 2011 – Susan Fitzgerald
- 2012 – WilliamsonChong
- 2013 – 5468796 Architecture
- 2014 – Omar Gandhi
- 2015 – Public Architecture + Communication
- 2016 – Heather Dubbeldam
- 2017 – KANVA
- 2018 – Acre Architects
- 2019 – Neeraj Bhatia
- 2022 – Studio of Contemporary Architecture and Studio Junction
- 2023 – Modern Office of Design + Architecture
- 2024 – D'Arcy Jones Architects
- 2026 – MOTIV Architects Inc.

=== Emerging Practitioner ===
- 2005 – Taymoore Balbaa
- 2006 – Michael Acht
- 2007 – Michaela MacLeod
- 2008 – Drew Sinclair
- 2009 – Kelly Nelson Doran
- 2010 – Elizabeth Paden
- 2011 – Samantha Lynch
- 2012 – Jason Tsironis
- 2013 – Brett MacIntyre
- 2014 – Jerome Lapierre
- 2015 – Nicole Reckziegel
- 2016 – Yves Patrick Poitras
- 2017 – Piper Bernbaum
- 2018 – David Verbeek
- 2019 – Kinan Hewitt
- 2022 – Yiyao Ivee Wang, Julia Nakanishi, and Paulette Cameron
- 2023 – Conrad Speckert
- 2024 – Daniel Wong
- 2026 – Micaela Stokes
