= Ordre des architectes du Québec =

Professional architects organization of Quebec, Canada

- Type: Professional organization
- Headquarters: Montréal, Québec, Canada
- Region served: Province of Quebec
- Website: oaq.com

The Ordre des architectes du Québec (lit. 'Order of Architects of Quebec') is a professional association representing architects in the Canadian province of Quebec. As of 2010, it claims more than 2,700 members.

From 1951, it awards the Médaille du Mérite to architects for their contribution to the development of the quality of architecture in Quebec.
