= Pablo Castro (footballer, born 1985) =

Uruguayan footballer (born 1985)

Personal information
- Full name: Pablo Adrián Castro Duret
- Date of birth: January 18, 1985 (age 41)
- Place of birth: Montevideo, Uruguay
- Height: 1.83 m (6 ft 0 in)
- Position: Defensive midfielder

Senior career*
Years	Team	Apps	(Gls)
2004–2009	Bella Vista	85	(8)
2007	→ Académica (loan)	0	(0)
2009–2010	Peñarol	0	(0)
2010–2011	Central Español	2	(0)
2011–2012	Villa Teresa	0	(0)
2013	Torque	7	(1)

International career
2007	Uruguay	1	(0)
- * Club domestic league appearances and goals as of 07:40, 28 December 2007 (UTC)

Pablo Adrián Castro Duret (born 18 January 1985) is a Uruguayan football player.

Castro played his only match for Uruguay on 7 February 2007, a friendly match 3-1 won Colombia.

In summer 2007, he left for Académica of Portuguese Liga, but did not play any official match.
