= Sean Collier Memorial =

Abstract environmental sculpture at MIT

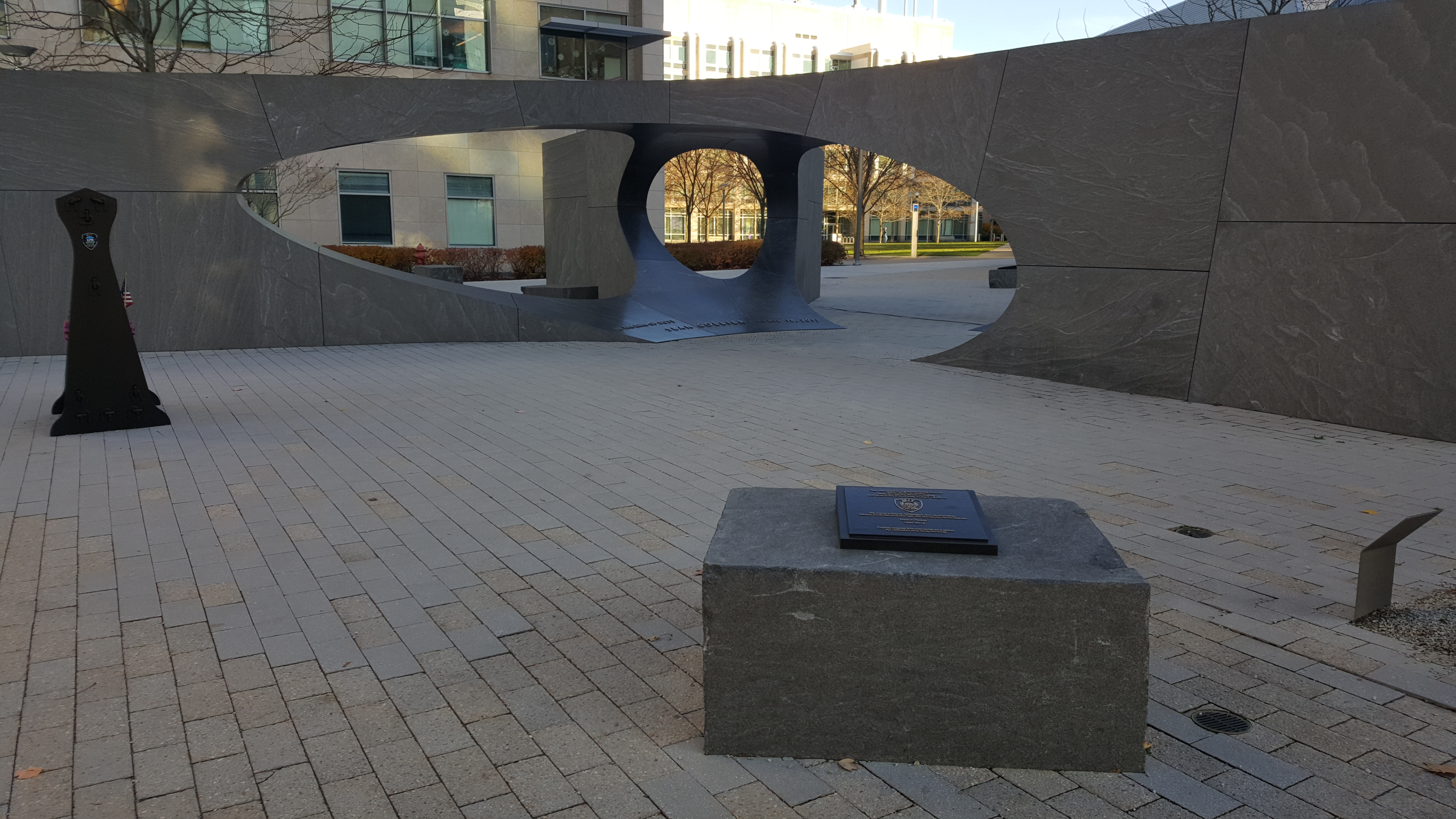
- The leftmost opening frames the site where Sean Collier died (2019 photo)
- Interactive map of Sean Collier Memorial
- Location: Cambridge, Massachusetts
- Coordinates: 42°21′44″N 71°05′24″W
- Designer: J. Meejin Yoon
- Type: Shallow domed arch
- Material: "Jet Mist" granite
- Weight: 320 tons
- Beginning date: April 2014
- Dedicated date: April 29, 2015
- Dedicated to: Sean Collier

The Sean Collier Memorial is a large abstract environmental sculpture located on the campus of the Massachusetts Institute of Technology in Cambridge, Massachusetts. It was designed by MIT faculty and students in memory of Sean Collier, a member of MIT Campus Police, who had been killed at the site by the Boston Marathon bombers on April 18, 2013. The project was proposed, designed, funded, fabricated, and installed in less than two years, and formally dedicated on April 29, 2015.

== History ==
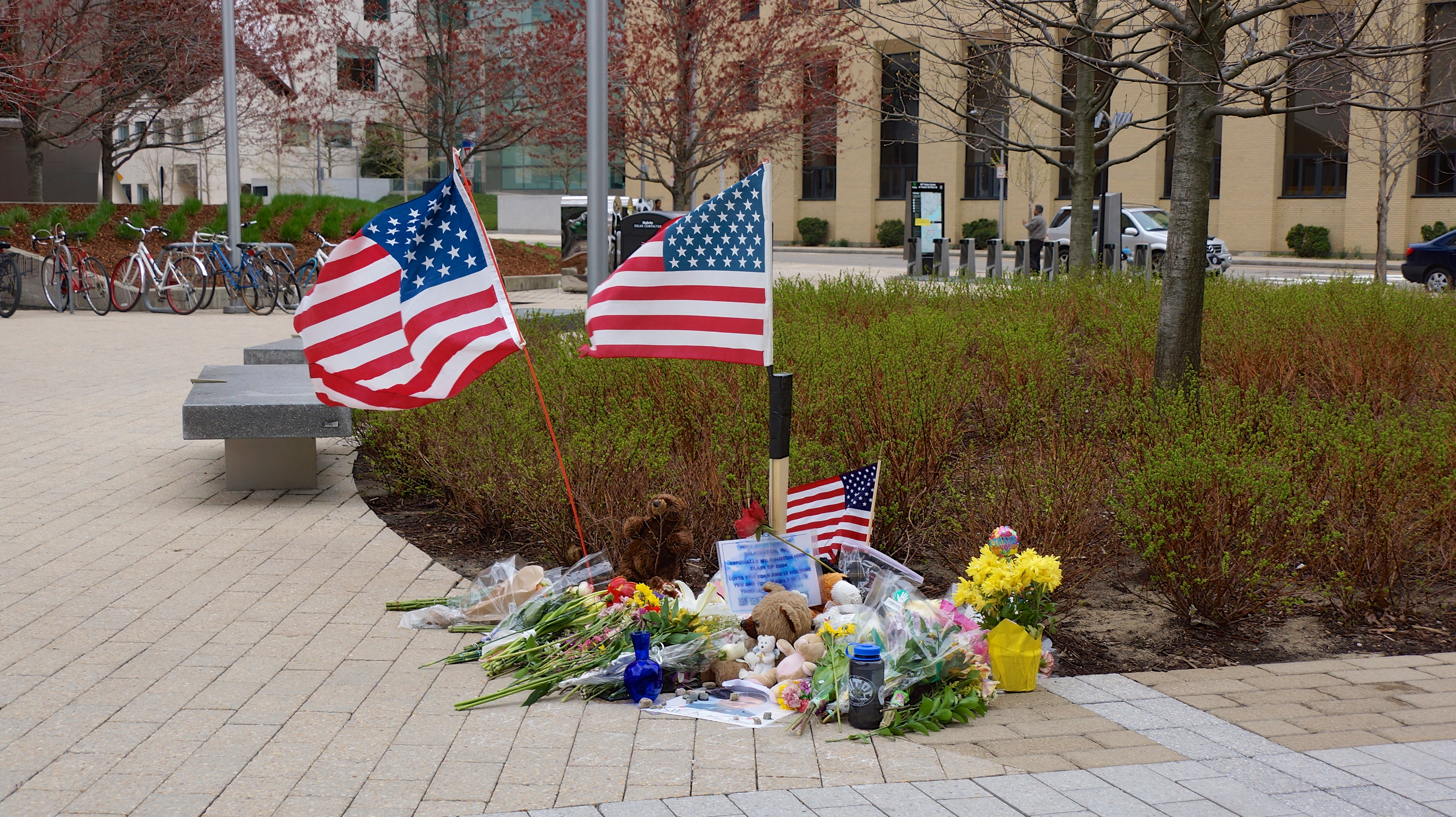
Improvised temporary memorial, April 20, 2013

A spontaneous, temporary improvised memorial of flowers, messages, and small objects appeared shortly after news of Collier's death. The MIT community wanted to create a permanent memorial, and assembled a committee of students, faculty, and police officers. A public call for ideas was put out in June 2013. The final design for the memorial was unveiled in April 2014, allowing only a year for fabrication of components and construction.

J. Meejin Yoon, then head of the MIT Department of Architecture, led the team which conceived the overall shape and design. Essential structural engineering design was done by MacArthur Prize professor John Ochsendorf and his students. The construction was performed on a tight schedule by Boston-based Suffolk Construction, coordinated by their project manager Rob Rogers, who was also a stepbrother of the slain officer.

On April 29, 2015, MIT held special ceremonies dedicating the memorial. MIT President Rafael Reif observed that the memorial represented the community coming together after tragedy: "We are held together by invisible forces too".

== Architecture ==
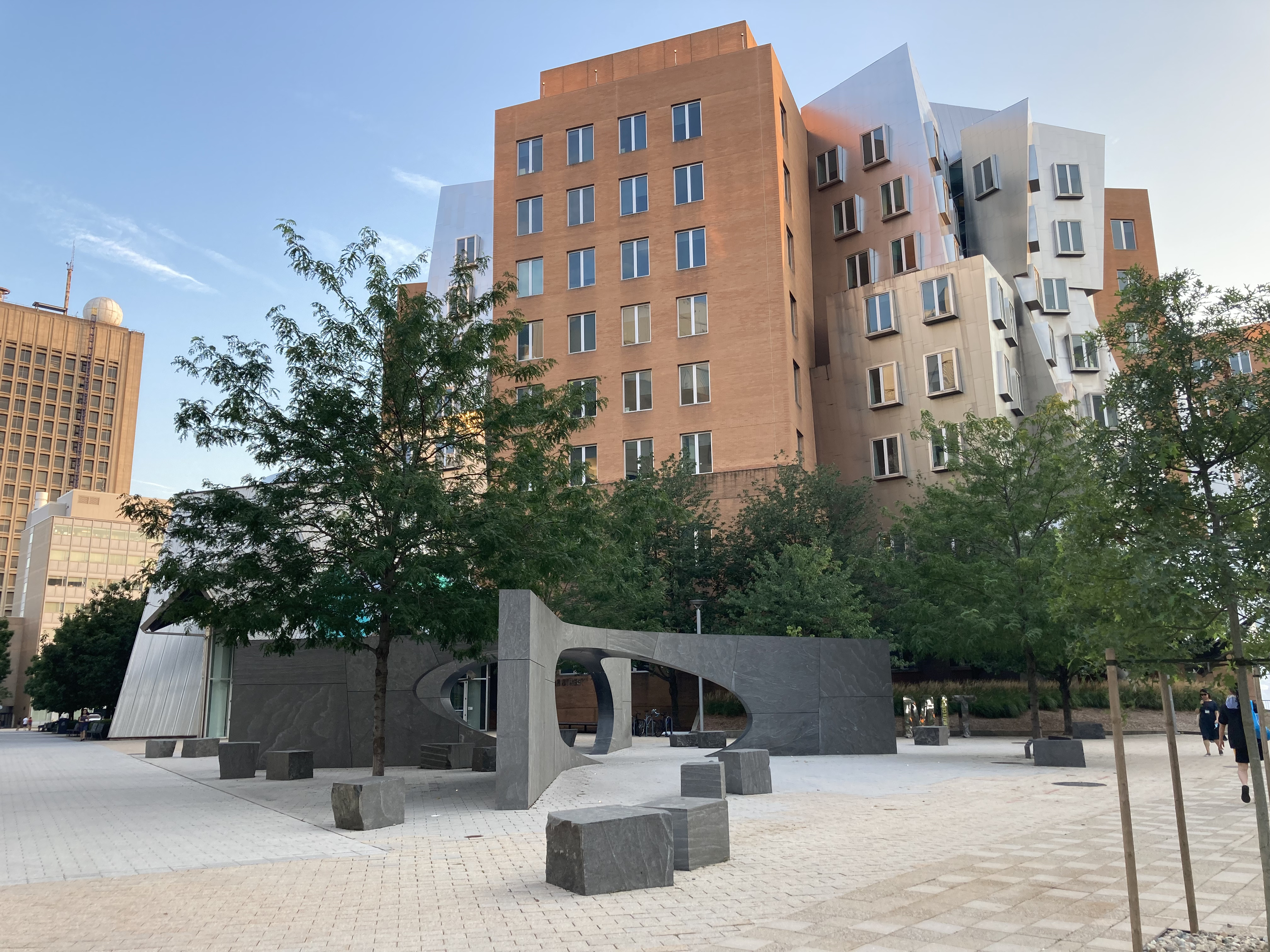
View of memorial from Vassar Street, with Stata Center in background (2021)

The memorial consists of 32 massive granite blocks precision-shaped under computer numerical control, and fitted together into a shallow open domed arch with 5 radial support wings splayed out like fingers of an open hand. This shape is a reference to the MIT motto Mens et Manus (Mind and Hand), and to Collier's spirit of helpfulness. The granite material honors Collier's love of hiking through the nearby White Mountains (New Hampshire) with the MIT Outing Club (MITOC).

The architect, J. Meejin Yoon, has written that the heavy stone blocks mutually support each other, expressing strength through unity. They shelter a large ovoid cavity that represents "a passage, a marker, and an aperture that reframes the site". The void represents the absence of the slain officer, and is shaped like an oblong stone from a memorial cairn which had been constructed at trailside by Collier's friends from MITOC.

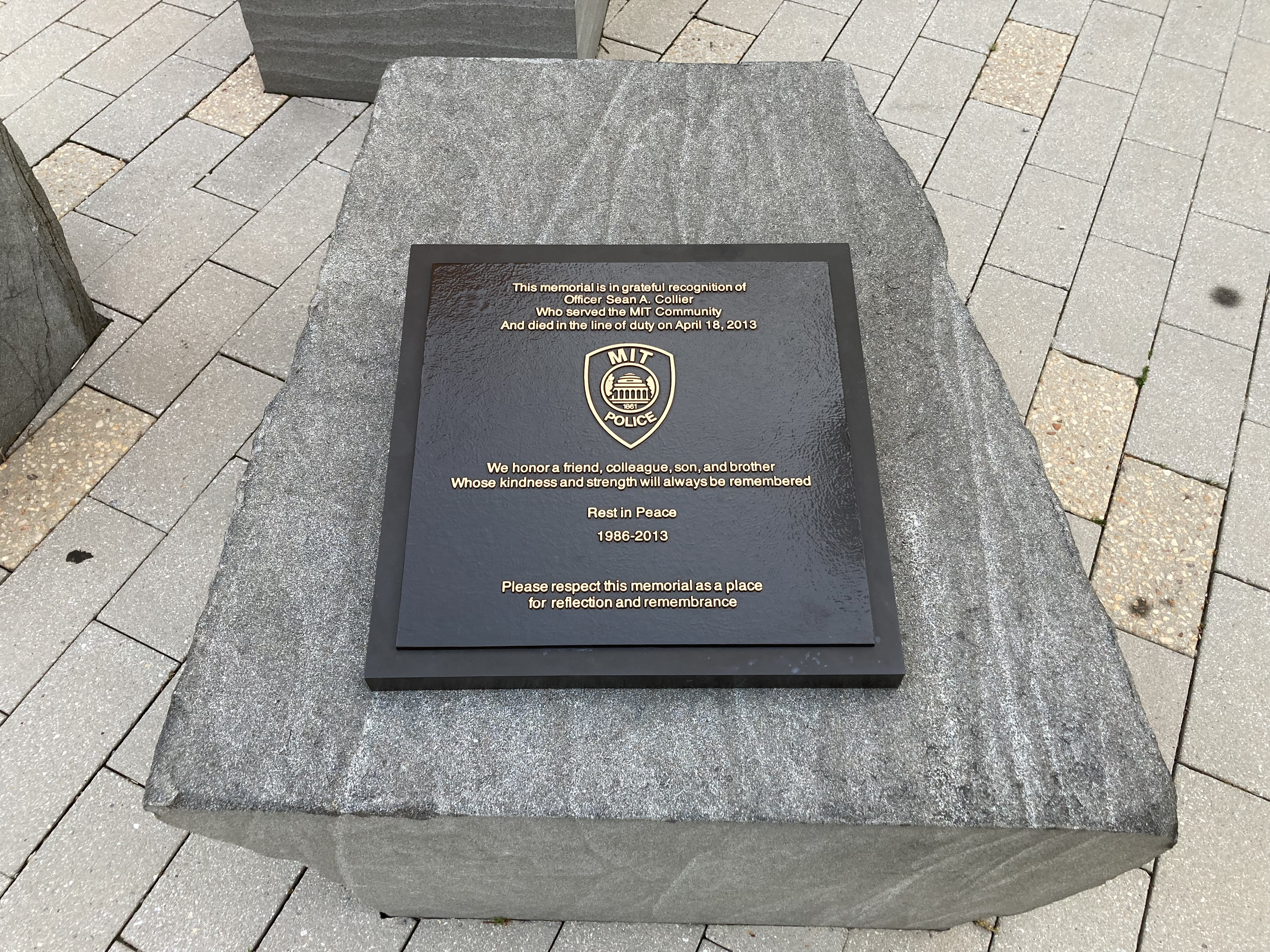
Memorial plaque

The design was evaluated by Ochsendorf and his students using computer simulations to study its resistance to a major earthquake. Compressive forces on each block were calculated to be in the range of 20,000 to 50,000 pounds (9,100 to 22,700 kg). Each joint between the stone blocks was shaped to be perpendicular to the forces transmitted through the joint, visually expressing the invisible forces that hold the structure up. The underground foundation, an essential part of the structure, is made of reinforced concrete to resist the spreading forces produced by the shallow arch it supports. The 190-short-ton (170,000 kg) weight of the structure is supported by mini-piles driven to a depth of 30–40 feet (9.1–12.2 m).

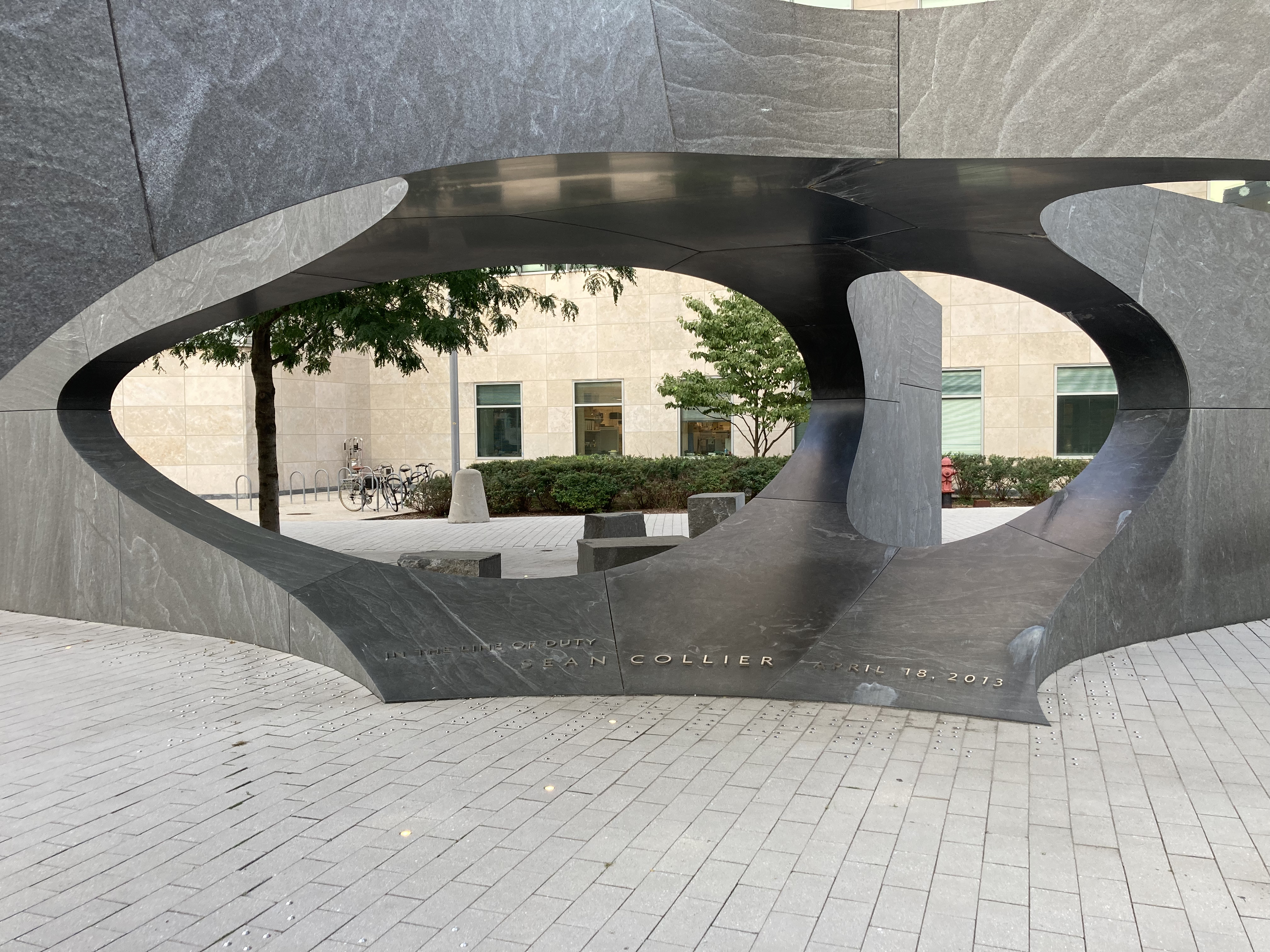
Central, ovoid cavity

The polished, tapered stone blocks were carved to a precision of 0.5 millimetres (0.020 in) using robotic saws and milling machines, and then surfaced with final finishing by hand. The blocks were installed by a specialized team of riggers operating a crane and machinery, under the guidance of Ochsendorf, his team of students, and a construction manager. The temporary support scaffolding was slowly lowered over the span of 8 hours, while the descent of the central 12,000-pound (5,400 kg) keystone was carefully monitored. Predicted to settle 5 to 15 millimetres (0.20 to 0.59 in), the stone was actually measured as descending 6 millimetres (0.24 in).

The memorial is physically sited immediately next to the location where Collier was murdered. An opening in the structure frames a view of the spot where he was sitting in his MIT Police car responding to a call for help, when he was ambushed and shot. Raised stainless steel buttons, encoding Collier's police badge number "179" in Braille, are installed into the pavement beneath the memorial arches, to discourage its use by skateboarders. Smaller granite blocks are placed around the periphery of the memorial, to provide seating for visitors. Honey locust trees provide a living canopy that marks the passage of time.

At night, in-ground LEDs illuminate the structure, and also represent the configuration of the stars overhead on the fatal night of April 18, 2013.
