= Meejin Yoon =

Korean-American architect and designer

- Hangul: 윤미진
- RR: Yun Mijin
- MR: Yun Mijin

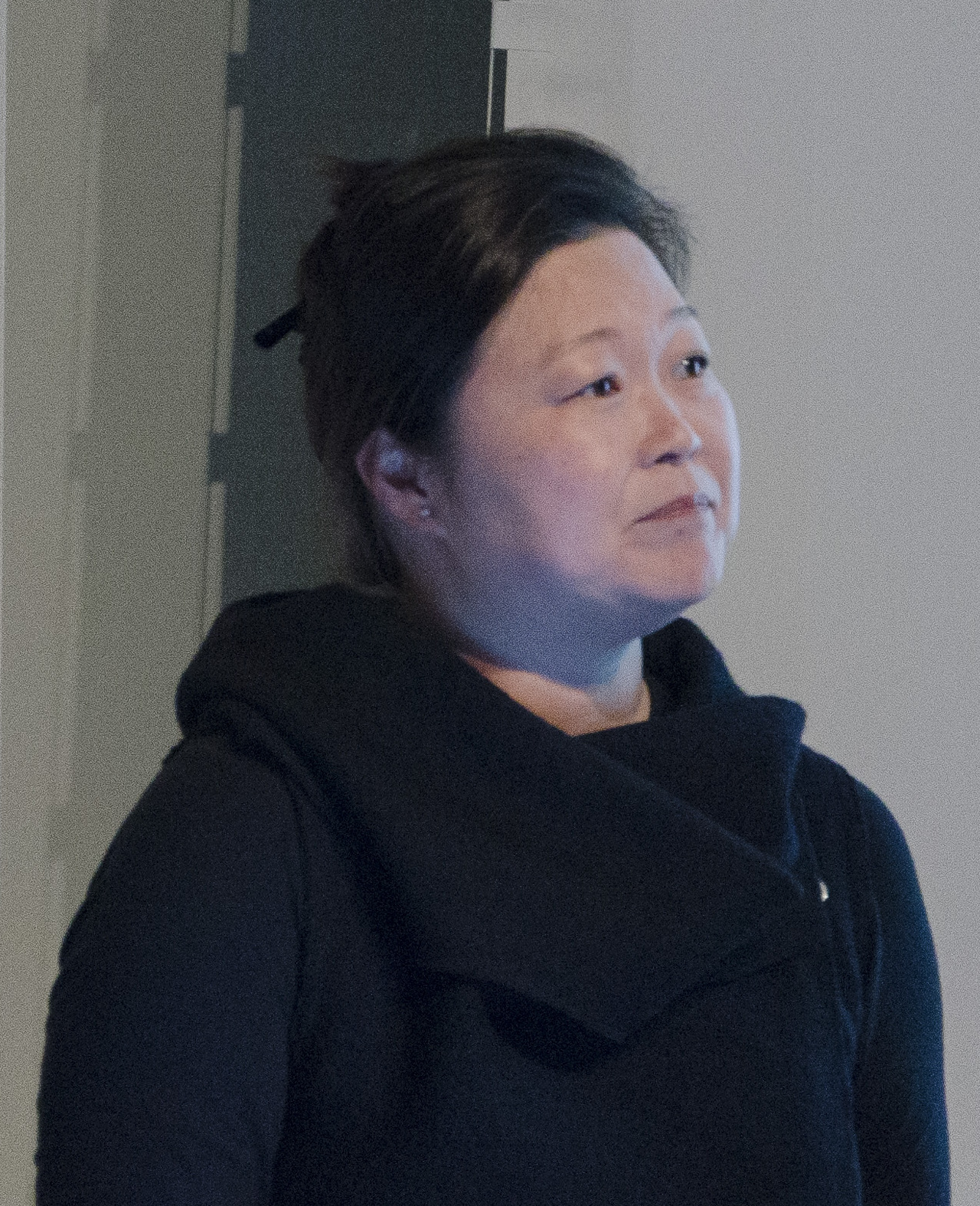
Meejin Yoon at Columbia GSAPP (2015)

J. Meejin Yoon (born 1972) is a Korean-American architect, designer, and educator. In 2014, Yoon was appointed as the first female head of the Department of Architecture at the Massachusetts Institute of Technology. In July 2018, she was named the Gale and Ira Drukier Dean of the College of Architecture, Art and Planning at Cornell University. In 2004, Yoon founded Höweler+Yoon Architecture with partner Eric Höweler.

Yoon's work is widely known for pioneering investigations in the intersections between architecture, technology, and the public realm. Notable works include White Noise White Light for the Athens 2004 Olympics; Double Horizon for the GSA at the San Ysidro Border Crossing; and the Sean Collier Memorial at the Massachusetts Institute of Technology. These projects are often cited for their innovative use of emerging technologies in architecture, design and fabrication.

== Career ==
Yoon was born in Seoul, Korea and grew up in the United States. After graduating from Cornell University with a B.Arch in 1995 and Harvard University Graduate School of Design in 1997 with a Masters of Architecture in Urban Design (with Distinction), she continued her research interest in architecture and urbanism as a Fulbright Fellow in Seoul, Korea in 1998. She began teaching at MIT in 2001.

Also in 2001, Yoon established MY Studio, to pursue creative works at the intersection of architecture, art and technology. With partner Eric Höweler, Yoon founded Höweler+Yoon Architecture in 2005. The firm is an international interdisciplinary design practice working across the domains of architecture, urban design, public space, immersive experience, and design strategy. Höweler + Yoon Architecture is based out of Boston, Massachusetts.

== Recognition ==
In 2021, Yoon was elected to the American Academy of Arts and Letters, a recognition of the highest form for artistic merit in the United States. Yoon is also the recipient of the Audi Urban Future Award in 2012, United States Artist Award in Architecture and Design in 2008, Architecture Record's Design Vanguard Award in 2007, and the Rome Prize in Design in 2005 from the American Academy in Rome. Yoon is also the 2013 recipient of MIT's Irwin Sizer Award for the Most Significant Improvement (and Innovations) to Education. In 2015, Yoon won 2015 New Generation Leader award from Architectural Record as part of the magazine's second annual Women in Architecture Forum and Awards event.

Her work has been exhibited at the Museum of Modern Art in New York, the Guggenheim Museum in New York, the Los Angeles Museum of Contemporary Art, the Museum of Contemporary Art in Chicago, the Smithsonian Cooper-Hewitt National Design Museum in New York, the Institut Valencia d’Art Modern in Spain, and the National Art Center in Tokyo. She was awarded the Leonardo da Vinci World Award of Arts in 2022.

== Publications ==
- Expanded Practice: Projects by Höweler+Yoon/MY Studio (Princeton Architectural Press 2009)
- Public Works: Unsolicited Small Projects for the Big Dig (MAP Book Publishers, 2008)
- Absence (Printed Matter and Whitney Museum of Art, 2003)
- Yoon, J. Meejin; Eric Höweler. 1001 Skyscrapers. New York: Princeton Architectural Press, 2003.

== Exhibitions ==
- The Eyes of the City, Bi-City Biennale of Urbanism + Architecture, Shenzhen, 2020
- The Road Ahead: Reimagining Mobility, Cooper Hewitt Smithsonian Design Museum, New York, 2018
