= Architectural League of New York =

U.S. non-profit organization

The Architectural League of New York is a non-profit organization "for creative and intellectual work in architecture, urbanism, and related disciplines".

The league dates from 1881, when Cass Gilbert organized meetings at the Salmagundi Club for young architects. In early years, members took turns assigning sketch problems with solutions then critiqued by established architects. In 1886 it was restarted by architect Russell Sturgis with exhibitions, lectures, dinners, tours, and juried annual exhibitions.

In 1934, the league allowed women to become members; Nancy Vincent McClelland was the first woman to join among many others.

During its history, many of New York's most prominent architects have served as president, including George B. Post, Henry Hardenbergh, Grosvenor Atterbury, Raymond Hood, Ralph Walker, and more recently, Robert A.M. Stern, Frances Halsband, Paul Byard, and Billie Tsien. In 2018, Paul Lewis was elected president.

The league embraces collaboration across the arts. Muralists and sculptors are invited to become members, and annual exhibitions have included sections for landscape architecture, painting, sculpture, and decorative arts.

== Emerging Voices ==
Since 1982, the League has organized Emerging Voices, an annual juried series which features architects and designers throughout North America who have a "significant body of realized work that not only represents the best of its kind, but also creatively addresses larger issues of architecture, landscape, and the built environment."

== The Architectural League Prize ==
The Architectural League Prize is one of North America’s most prestigious awards for young architects and designers. The Prize, established in 1981 and known as the Young Architects Forum from 1981 to 2009, recognizes exemplary and provocative work by young practitioners and provides a public forum for the exchange of their ideas. Each year The Architectural League and the Young Architects + Designers Committee (a group selected each year from past winners of the League Prize) organize a themed portfolio competition. Six winners, who must be ten years or less out of school, are then invited to present their work in a variety of public fora, including lectures, an exhibition, and on the League’s website.

== Bibliography ==
- Young Architects 7: Situating (2006), Princeton Architectural Press, ISBN 978-1-568-98573-2
- Young Architects 8: Instability (2007), Princeton Architectural Press, ISBN 978-1-568-98637-1
- Young Architects 9: Proof (2008), Princeton Architectural Press, ISBN 978-1-568-98743-9
- Young Architects 10: Resonance (2009), Princeton Architectural Press, ISBN 978-1-568-98809-2
- Young Architects 11: Foresight (2010), Princeton Architectural Press, ISBN 978-1-568-98887-0
- Young Architects 12: ReSource (2011), Princeton Architectural Press, ISBN 978-1-568-98998-3
- Young Architects 13: It's Different (2012), Princeton Architectural Press, ISBN 978-1-616-89057-5
- Young Architects 14: No Precedent (2013), Princeton Architectural Press, ISBN 978-1-616-89105-3
- Young Architects 15: Range (2014), Princeton Architectural Press, ISBN 978-1-616-89239-5
- Young Architects 16: Overlay (2015), Princeton Architectural Press, ISBN 978-1-616-89369-9
- Thirty Years of Emerging Voices: Idea, Form, Resonance (2015), Princeton Architectural Press, ISBN 978-1-616-89197-8
