= Princeton Architectural Press =

Division of Chronicle Books

- Parent company: Chronicle Books
- Founded: 1981
- Founder: Kevin Lippert
- Country of origin: United States
- Headquarters location: New York, New York
- Distribution: Chronicle Books (US); Raincoast Books (Canada); Abrams & Chronicle Books (UK); Bookreps NZ (New Zealand); Books at Maniac (Australia)
- Nonfiction topics: architecture, design, nature, gardening, cooking, pop culture, and other illustrated and visual nonfiction book categories
- Official website: www.papress.com

PA Press (formerly Princeton Architectural Press) is a book publisher founded in 1981 by Kevin Lippert in Princeton, New Jersey, which is now a division of Chronicle Books based in New York City. Originally focused on architecture, it has broadened its scope to include new nonfiction book categories such as nature, gardening, cookbooks, and pop culture, as well as illustrated children's books and stationery and puzzle products. PA Press is not related to or affiliated with Princeton University Press.
