= HHF =

HHF may refer to:

- HHF Architects, a Swiss architectural firm
- Haitian Health Foundation, an American relief organization
- Hardest Hit Fund, of US Treasury
- Harmony Hall Fukui, a concert hall, Japan
- Hearing Health Foundation, US
- Heinz-Harald Frentzen (born 1967), H-HF, German racing driver
