= Consulate General of Switzerland, Chicago =

Consulate General of Switzerland in Chicago 3 other official names: Schweizerisches Generalkonsulat in Chicago (German); Consulat général de Suisse à Chicago (French); Consolato generale di Svizzera a Chicago (Italian)
- Location: John Hancock Center
- Address: 875 North Michigan Avenue #3880, Chicago

The Consulate General of Switzerland in Chicago is a diplomatic mission representing Switzerland meant to serve the Midwest United States. Reportedly having been the first country to set up a consulate general in the city in 1864, the consulate was re-opened at a new site in 2019 after a five-year hiatus. A new chancery inside Hancock Tower was finished in 2021, with the modernist interior gaining some media attention.

== History ==
Originally, the consulate was opened in Detroit in 1850 as an honorary post. In 1864, the consulate was moved to Chicago, reportedly the first such mission in the city; however, the mission continued to be staffed by honorary consuls until 1933, later being promoted to consulate-general on 30 May 1958.

It was announced that the consulate would close in 2012 as part of a government-mandated downsizing of the Swiss diplomatic presence to reduce expenses. Although the decision was protested by the Swiss Club of Chicago, who petitioned for the consulate to stay open, and debates were held in the Swiss Parliament to re-evaluate the cutbacks in general, the shutdown was ultimately approved, with Parliament deciding that an honorary consulate would be set up in its place. The mission was closed as planned in 2014, with the Washington, D.C., and New York missions taking on its consular duties. However, increased Swiss investment in Chicago and surrounding areas led to an announcement in 2018 that the consulate would be reopened. In September 2019, the consulate was reopened under the guidance of then-foreign affairs head Ignazio Cassis, who described the decision to close the consulate in the first place as a "mistake" in a 2021 interview. However, consular services were not restored, with the 2014 arrangement staying in place. According to the website, this remains the case as of September 2022.

== Chancery ==
The current chancery, located in the John Hancock Center, was designed by HHF Architects and Kwong Von Glinow. It was completed on 21 July 2021. The interior, inspired by the works of Swiss-American architect Otto Kolb, has gained some coverage for its use of modernism, lighting, and a "green core".
