= Bilbao (disambiguation) =

Bilbao is a municipality and city in Spain.

Bilbao may also refer to:

- Bilbao (surname), a surname
- Bilbao (Mesoamerican site), an archaeological site in Guatemala
- Bilbao (Madrid Metro), a Madrid Metro station in Spain
