= Bilbao (surname) =

Bilbao is a Spanish surname of Basque origin. Notable people with the surname include:

- Beatriz Bilbao (born 1951), Venezuelan composer
- Esteban de Bilbao Eguía (1879–1970), Spanish politician
- Francisco Bilbao (1823–1865), Chilean writer, philosopher and politician
- Juan Bilbao Mintegi (1900–?), Spanish footballer
- Marcelino Bilbao Bilbao (1920–2014), Spanish soldier
- Mariví Bilbao (1930–2013), Spanish actress
- Pello Bilbao (born 1990), Spanish cyclist
- Tatiana Bilbao (born 1972), Mexican architect
- Tomás Bilbao Hospitalet (1890–1954), Basque-origin Spanish architect and politician
