= Kunsthalle Basel =

Museum in Basel (Switzerland)

Coordinates: 47°33′14″N 7°35′27″E

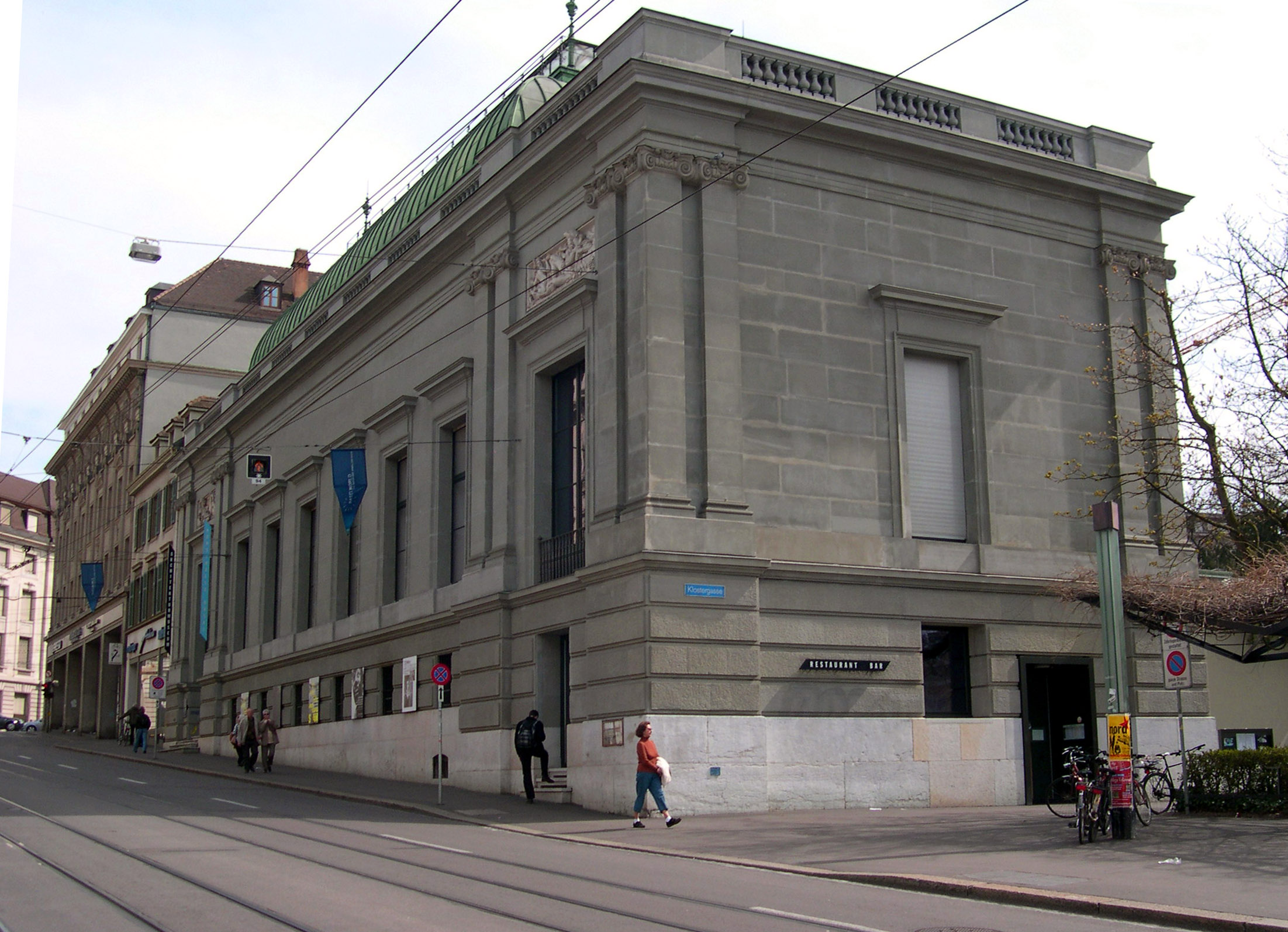
- The neoclassical building of 1872
- Established: 1872
- Location: Basel, Switzerland
- Website: kunsthallebasel.ch

Kunsthalle Basel is a contemporary art gallery in Basel, Switzerland.

As Switzerland's oldest and still most active institution for contemporary art established in the year of 1872, Kunsthalle Basel forms a vital part of Basel's cultural centre and is located next to the city's theatre and opposite the concert house Stadtcasino.

== History ==
The construction of Kunsthalle Basel was prompted in 1864 by the merger of the Basler Künstlergesellschaft (in English: Basel Society of Artists) and the Basler Kunstverein (in English: Basel Art Association), which was founded in 1839. In the 1920s and 1930s, before the opening of Kunstmuseum Basel, Kunsthalle Basel was home to and displayed a part of Basel's public art collections. Due to financial issues in the 1950s, there was a time when the building was rented to the state, but, after being renovated in 1969, it was returned to the Kunstverein.

In 1949, under the direction of Lucas Lichtenhahn, the so-called "Impressionist Exhibition," which encompassed a total of 244 works, also featured Claude Monet's "Water Lilies" for the first time in their history outside of France.

With the exhibition "Die neue amerikanische Malerei" (in English: "The New American Painting") in 1958, which was organized in collaboration with the Museum of Modern Art in New York City, the Kunsthalle Basel became the first place in the whole of Europe, and outside the United States, where the works of American expressionist artists, including those by Mark Rothko and Jackson Pollock, were displayed in a museum setting.

The museum also hosts the library of Basler Kunstverein, which holds 30,000 items related to contemporary art, and a photo archive of the museum's history and past exhibits.

== Architecture ==
Using revenue from two of the ferry services across the Rhine, Kunsthalle Basel was built between 1869 and 1872 based on a design by Johann Jakob Stehlin-Burckhardt. The artists Arnold Böcklin, Karl Brünner (1833-1871), Ernst Stückelberg and Charles Iguel (1826-1897) contributed the architectural adornment of the building. The ground floor of the building was dedicated to serve as an artist's clubhouse (today the Kunsthalle Basel Restaurant).

By 1927, the building had been extended several times to additionally house a workshop for sculptors and a sculpture hall (today the Stadtkino Basel). Between 1969 and 1973, the Kunsthalle underwent its first period of renovation. The library, whose inventory goes back to the founding year of the Kunstverein and today has a focus on contemporary art publications, in 1992 was installed permanently in the rooms of the former caretaker's apartment. In 2004, the Steinberg building underwent further, major renovations executed by the architects Miller & Maranta with the intent of both restoring its former glory and simultaneously updating it in an attempt to prolong its relevance in the art and architecture world. During this renovation, the Swiss Architecture Museum S AM moved into the first floor of the building.

== Exhibitions ==
Artists who have had solo exhibitions include:

- Carl Andre
- Sadie Benning
- Jimmie Durham
- Cyprien Gaillard
- Susan Hiller
- Anne Imhof
- Zhana Ivanova
- Sam Lewitt
- Sarah Morris
- Ernesto Neto
- Shahryar Nashat
- Joanna Piotrowska
- Pamela Rosenkranz
- Vivian Suter

== Directors ==
- 1909–1934: Wilhelm Barth
- 1934–1949: Lucas Lichtenhan
- 1949–1955: Robert T. Stoll
- 1955–1967: Arnold Rüdlinger
- 1968–1973: Peter F. Althaus
- 1974–1976: Carlo Huber
- 1976–1978: Werner von Mutzenbecher and Maria Netter (ad interim)
- 1978–1988: Jean-Christophe Ammann
- 1988–1995: Thomas Kellein
- 1996–2002: Peter Pakesch
- 2003–2014: Adam Szymczyk
- 2014–2023: Elena Filipovic
- 2024–present: Mohamed Almusibli

== See also ==
- Kunsthalle
- Swiss Architecture Museum
- Museums in Basel
- List of museums in Switzerland
