= Jinhua Architecture Park =

Park in Jinhua, China

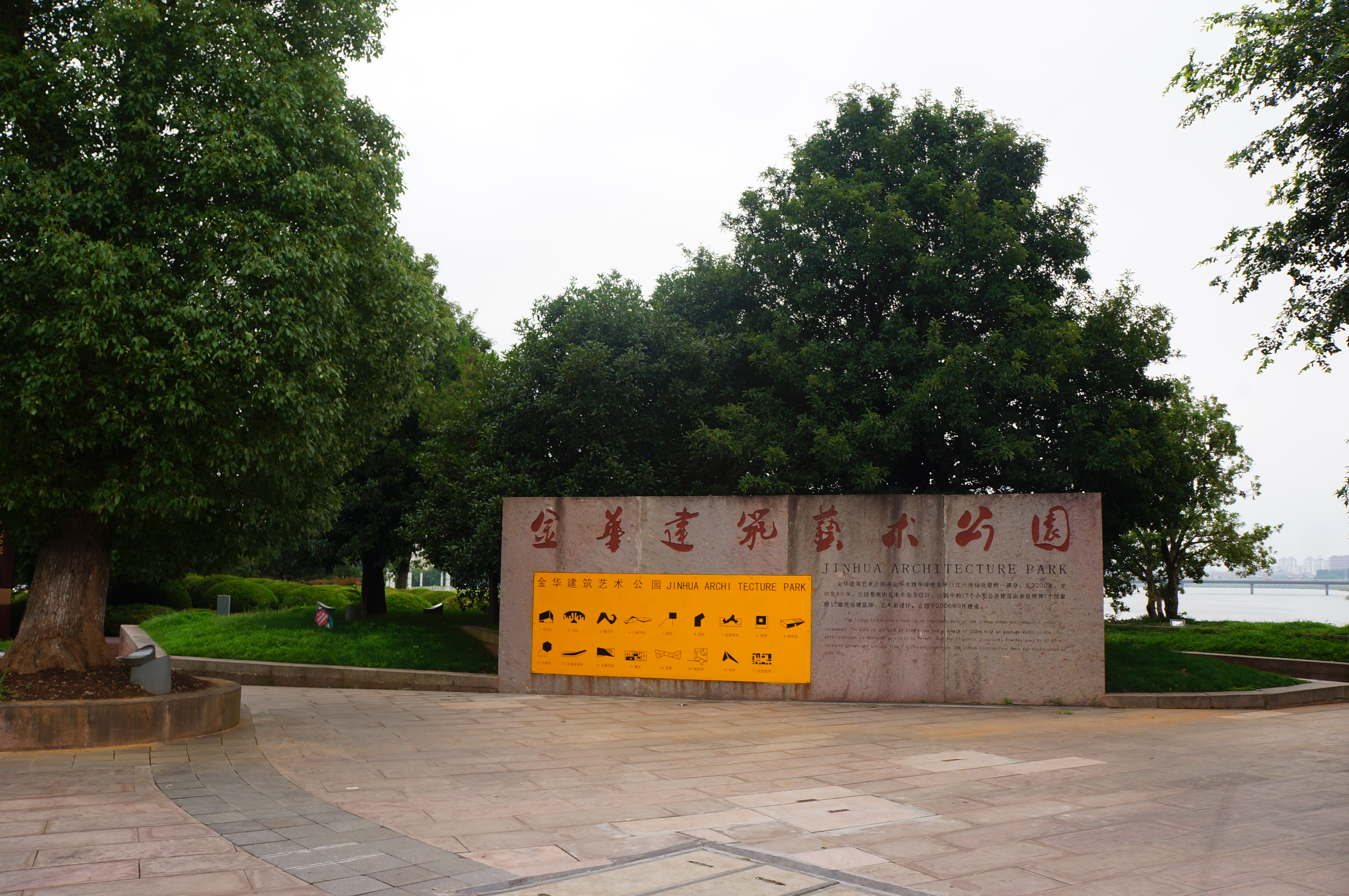
Front gate of the Park.

Jinhua Architecture Park (Chinese: t 金華建築藝術公園, s 金华建筑艺术公园, p Jīnhuá Jiànzhù Yìshù Gōngyuán) is a park in Jinhua, a city in central Zhejiang province in eastern China.

== History ==
The park contains 17 specially designed pavilions by Chinese and international architects. The chief organizer and curator is Chinese designer and architect Ai Weiwei. Naihan Li served as the project coordinator. The project began in 2002 and was completed in February 2005.

== Works ==
No.	Piece Name (Chinese)	Architect/Artist	Country	Image	No.	Piece Name (Chinese)	Architect/Artist	Country	Image
1	问询中心; Welcome Center	Till Schweizer	Germany		2	茶亭; The Ancient Tree	Christ & Gantenbein	Switzerland	
3	展示厅; Exhibition Room	Tatiana Bilbao	Mexico		4	儿童游戏; Playground	HHF Architects	Switzerland	
5	茶室; Tea House	Liu Jiakun	China		6	厕所; Toilet	Wang Xingwei, Xu Tiantian	China	
7	综合空间; Comprehensive Space	Yung Ho Chang	China/US		8	网吧; Net Cafe	Ding Yi, Chen Shuyu	China	
9	咖啡室; Cafe House	Wang Shu	China		10	古陶馆; Archaeological Archives	Ai Weiwei	China	
11	冰激凌报亭; Newsstand	Toshiko Mori	Japan		12	多媒体室; Multimedia Room	Erhard An-He Kinzelbach	United States	
13	餐饮; Restaurant/Pavilion	Fün Design	Netherland		14	茶室; Bridging Tea House	Fernando Romero	Mexico	
15	禅空间; Zen Space	Herzog & de Meuron	Switzerland		16	书吧; Book Bar	Michael Maltzan	United States	
