= Naihan Li =

Chinese designer architect (born 1981)

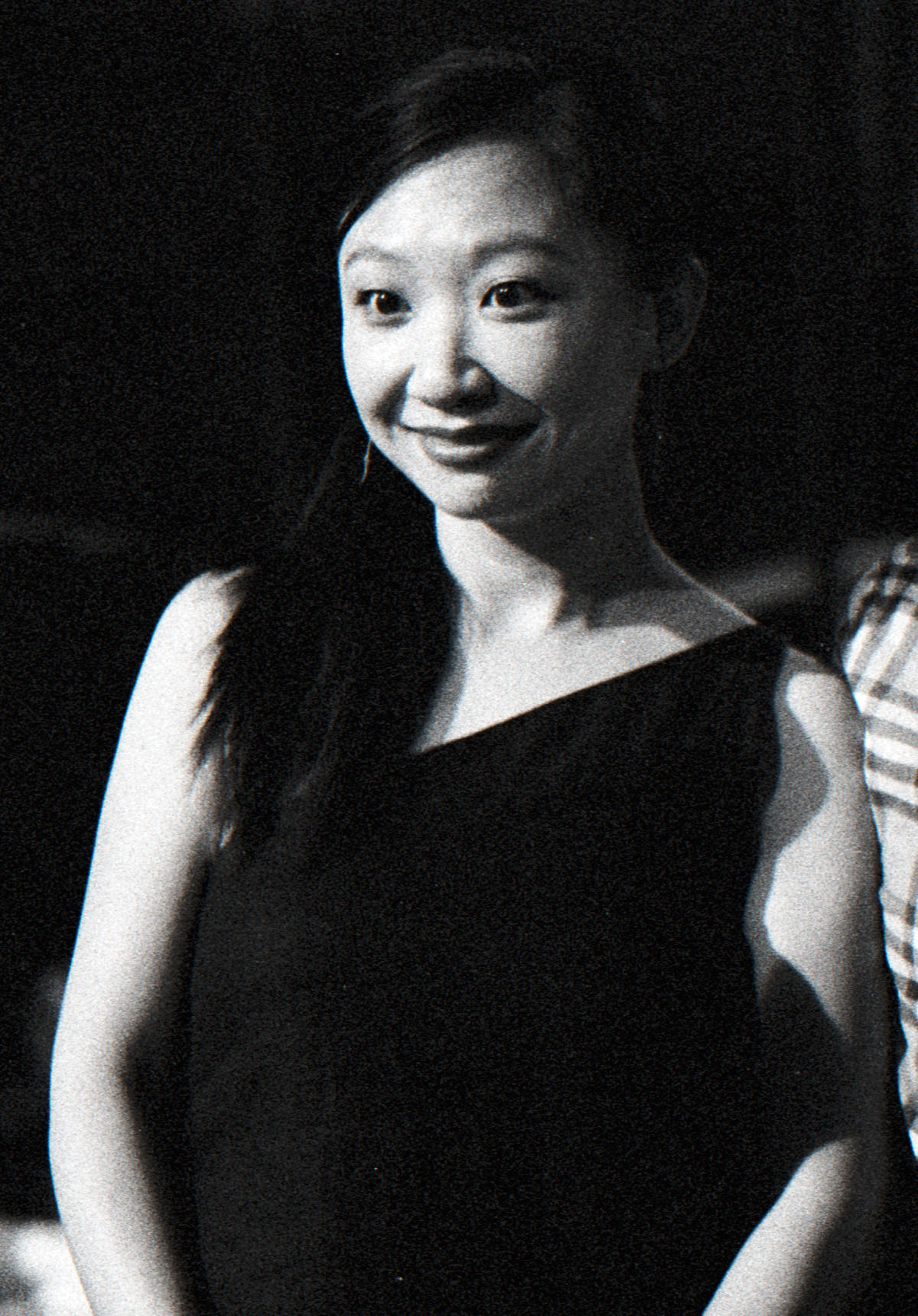
- Born: 5 January 1981 (age 45); Harbin, China
- Other names: Jing Jing, 李婧
- Education: Bartlett School of Architecture
- Occupation: architect
- Known for: The Crates Series furniture
- Website: naihanli.com

Naihan Li (born 5 January 1981) is a Chinese designer architect. She currently lives and works in Beijing in the Caochangdi Art District.

== Biography ==
After graduating from Bartlett School of Architecture (UCL), Li returned to Beijing where she first collaborated with Ai Weiwei as coordinator for the Jinhua Architectural Park development. She later worked as independent architect and designer for architectural and graphic design projects of different scales. Her finished constructions include Keruo Space, a space for practices in Caochangdi, and the Royal Kitchen restaurant and shop inside the Forbidden City.

After the establishment of BAO Atelier Hong Kong Ltd.), as a director of the company, she led graphic and catalogue design projects such as "Aftershock- Contemporary British Art" for the British Council; "ALLLOOKSAME-China, Japan and Korea art", and "China Business Guide" for Santander Bank. Additionally, she worked on the exhibition design of Seduction-Borderline Moving Image and Nike Golden 08 Beijing Olympic Creative research project.

Other positions include project coordinator and designer of the UBS Art Collection Show in Shanghai Art Museum, "Memories for Tomorrow"; Beijing National Art Museum of China's "Moving Horizons", and the Guangdong Art Museum show, "Fact and Fiction."; participation in the Goethe Institution's 20th Anniversary project in Beijing, "Goethe Night" as an artist, where her installation "Brandenburg Gate" was collected by the institution; and featured designer and exhibition designer at China Design Market exhibition during Milan Design Week in 2010 and 2011.

In 2009, Naihan was a featured artist and exhibition designer for the E-Art Festival, New Media Archaeology Exhibition in Shanghai and exhibition Emporium in Milan, Italy.

In 2010, she started her own furniture design studio that includes the furniture series, The Crates, which has been nominated for Design of the Year Award 2012 by the Design Museum in London.

In 2011, she participated as exhibition designer to the Gwangju Design Biennale Un-Named section, curated by Ai Weiwei, and developed a new series of furniture called FOLD for the exhibition display. Also in 2011, she participated in Beijing Design Week as a featured designer where she showcased her collection of mobile pop-up furniture CRATES, and was nominated for the W Hotel Designer of the Future Award, Design Miami 2012.

She initiated RAWR Design Laboratory and organized Beijing Design Week Design Hub Caochangdi Community, working with Chinese contemporary artists Ai Wei Wei in 2012 and Liu Wei in 2013 to create the CCD Pavilion installation. In 2013, she organized A Taste of Guizhou exhibition featuring contemporary design in crossover with Chinese traditional craftsmanship from the Miao ethnic group. In the same year, she participated as a featured designer in the Digital Crystal Exhibition by Swarovski in Beijing with her work, Crystal Puzzle.

In 2014, Li's CCTV wardrobe from the I Am a Monument Series was featured in the Curio Section of the 10th Design Miami. During this time, she was the Featured Designer of Design Shanghai 2014. She also worked with department store chain Lane Crawford on their 2014 A/W Collection launch project in Hong Kong, Shanghai, and Beijing with her metal crate Hydroponic Garden Wardrobe collection. She started her collaboration with Sino Crane Huahe Group on a brand new collection of domestic furniture.

In 2015, she designed YUZ Museum Shanghai's Museum Cafe, participated as one of the featured designers in Lane Crawford 165 Celebration project in conjunction with Swarovski. She is currently launching her own lifestyle product line, Bored to Death, a digital publication: Unfollow, and an unconventional event brand called The Party in Shanghai.

In 2016, her CCTV Wardrobe and Birmingham Library Drawer from I am a Monument series were featured in the exhibition Alarmark! at the XXI Triennale di Milano, and her original crates series were featured in the Expended Housing exhibition of the triennale. CCTV Wardrobe has been officially acquired by the M+ Museum, Hong Kong and was featured at their design department's inaugurating exhibition.

In 2017, Li participated in Superbenches, a development project aimed at revitalizing Stockholm's Jarfalla suburb. Li also contributed a virtual reality installation to the Himalayan Museum in Shanghai, as a response to Leonardo da Vinci's series of deluge sketches.

In 2018, she showcased a new body of work with Amy Li Gallery in Beijing, including the "Leaning Mountain Sofa", part of the third installment of the I Am a Monument series, which is inspired by Chinese mythology and the Dunhuang Cave Paintings. She also contributed production design for Jiang Wen's film, Hidden Man.
