= Ann Philbin =

American museum director

- Education: University of New Hampshire (B.A., B.F.A.); New York University (M.A.)
- Occupation: Museum director

Ann Philbin is an American museum director. From 1999 to 2024, she was director of the Hammer Museum in Los Angeles; before this she was the director of the Drawing Center in New York City.

== Early life and education ==
Philbin's parents were an artist and a lawyer in the John F. Kennedy administration. She received her B.A. in art history and B.F.A. in painting from the University of New Hampshire, Durham, in 1976 and her M.A. in museum studies/arts administration from New York University in 1982.

At the University of New Hampshire, Philbin was a member of the Gay Students Organization, which faced controversy when Governor of New Hampshire Meldrim Thomson Jr. threatened to cut university funding if the group refused to disband. In 1974, the United States Court of Appeals for the First Circuit in Boston upheld the decision made by the United States District Court for the District of New Hampshire, and this landmark case established the constitutional right for gay students groups to exist on campus.

== Career ==
Prior to her arrival at the Hammer Museum, Philbin lived and worked in New York as an independent curator. She served as curator of the Ian Woodner Family Collection followed by a position at the Curt Marcus Gallery as an art dealer. Having acted as director of The Drawing Center in New York for nine years, Philbin was appointed Director of the Hammer Museum in Los Angeles, where she has remained for over twenty years. Philbin is one of ten leading art museum directors interviewed by Michael E. Shapiro, Director Emeritus of the High Museum of Art, in In Eleven Museums, Eleven Directors: Conversations on Art & Leadership on how the directors came into their leadership roles, the challenges they face, and what they see as the future of museums.

=== The Drawing Center, 1990–1999 ===
From 1990 through 1999, Philbin served as director of The Drawing Center in New York, where she curated exhibitions of works on paper in addition to managing the institution's overall programming and administration. Philbin is credited with revitalizing the institution through a creative approach to exhibiting the medium of drawing, presenting work from established artists while also introducing lesser-known artists to The Drawing Center's audience. Along with these developments in the exhibition program, Philbin turned the space into a gathering center for community groups, implementing a series of monthly readings and other public events.

=== Hammer Museum, 1999–2024 ===
After Henry Hopkins retired in 1998, Philbin was appointed director of the Hammer Museum in 1999. As director, she oversaw a complex group of art holdings, including collections amassed by Armand Hammer and UCLA's Murphy Sculpture Garden and Grunwald Center, a 45,000-piece graphic arts trove. The newest addition was a rapidly growing collection of contemporary art with 1,000 pieces in place, strongest in works on paper and Southern California art. Within Philbin's first decade in the position, the museum's annual operating budget grew from $5 million to $22 million, and its staff from 35 to over 200. She is credited with re-energizing the institution and making it a "nexus of LA's arts community." Under Philbin's leadership, the Hammer quadrupled its attendance to about 250,000 visitors per year.

In 2003, The New York Times reported that Philbin was one of the candidates interviewed for the position as director of the Whitney Museum; the position eventually went to Adam D. Weinberg.

In addition to her role at the Hammer, Philbin has also served on the selection committee that chose the artist exhibiting at the American pavilion at the Venice Biennale. In 2015, she and Steve Martin jointly curated a retrospective of Lawren Harris' work at the Hammer.

In October 2023, Philbin announced her decision to step down from her post in November 2024.

==== Made in L.A. ====
In 2012, Philbin established Made in L.A., a biennial exhibition at the Hammer Museum in Los Angeles. The exhibition presents work by emerging and under-recognized Los Angeles-based artists across various media, including commissioned works created for the exhibition.

==== Capital Campaign ====
In 2018 the Hammer announced a $180 million capital campaign in support of an ambitious transformation plan for the museum spaces. The majority of the funds will be used to expand exhibition and public areas, increasing gallery space by 60% and adding 20,000 square feet of public space. The renovation, a continuation of previous building projects by architect Michael Maltzan, also included a revamped entrance at Wilshire and Westwood boulevards designed to maximize the Hammer's visual presence.

=== Later career ===
In 2026, Philbin and Steve Martin jointly curated “Martin Mull: The Joys of Indoor/Outdoor Living” at the Santa Barbara Museum of Art, the first major museum exhibition of Mull’s artwork in 20 years.

== Personal life ==
Philbin is married to her longtime partner, Cynthia Wornham, a public relations and communications executive who served as senior vice president at the Natural History Museum of Los Angeles County. They reside in a house designed by Buff, Straub & Hensman in Beverly Hills.

== Awards and honors ==
From 2005 to 2012, Philbin was ranked in ArtReview's Power 100. In both 2018 and 2019, Philbin was included on Los Angeles Business Journal's LA500 list, a selection of 500 individuals chosen for their exceptional contributions to the community of business in Los Angeles.

In 2018, Philbin received an honor from the French Consulate of Los Angeles which elevated her to the rank of Officier in National des Arts et des Lettres, received for presenting the work of French artists.

In 2020, Philbin was elected to the American Academy of Arts and Sciences.

In 2025, Philbin received the Getty Prize, recognizing her accomplishments in advancing appreciation for the arts.
