= Star Apartments =

Housing complex for homeless residents in Los Angeles, California, United States

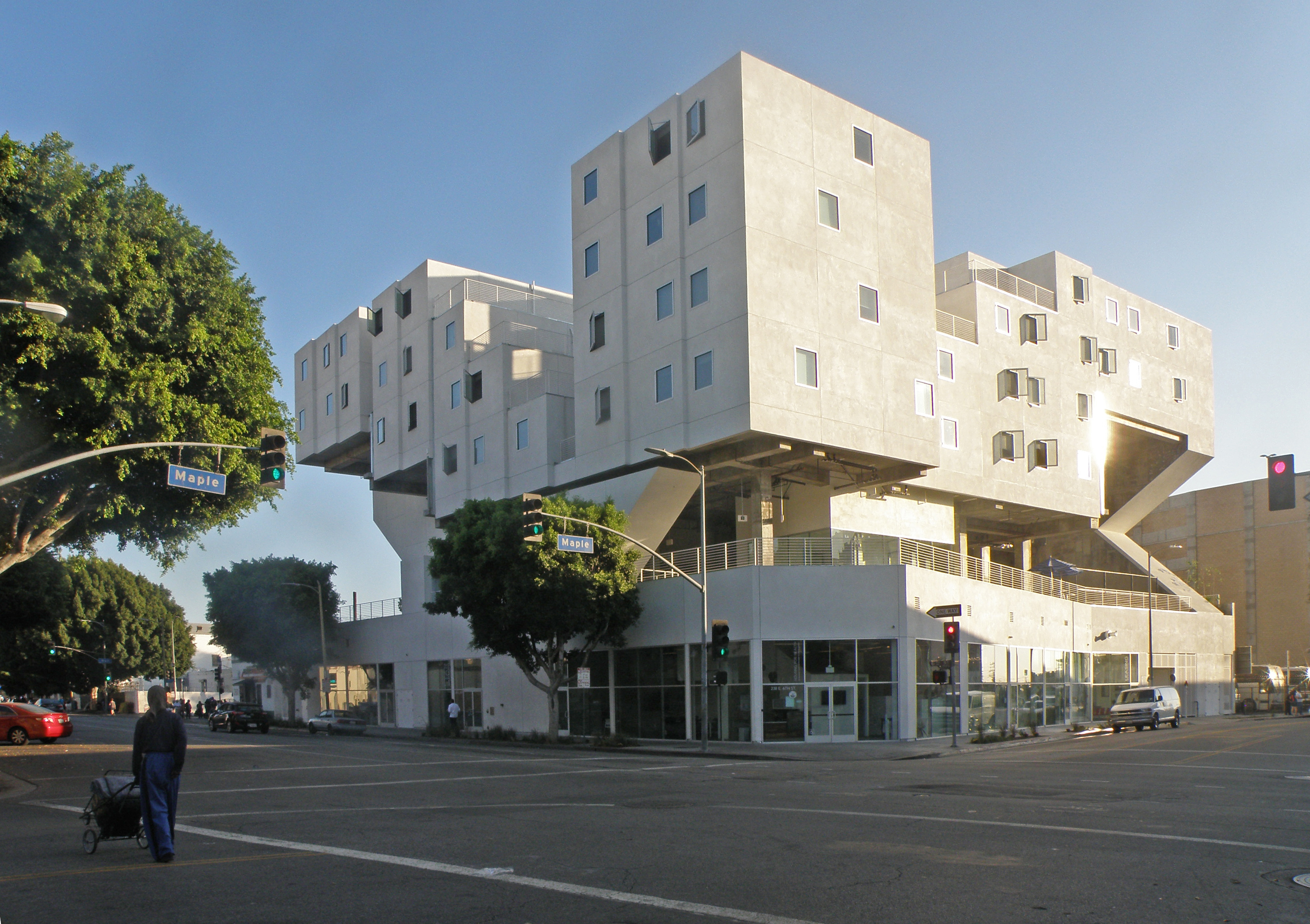
- Interactive map of the Star Apartments area

General information
- Type: Mixed use (mainly residential)
- Location: East 6th Street, Skid Row, Los Angeles, United States
- Coordinates: 34.043453°N 118.247746°W
- Opened: October 2014
- Cost: US$40 million
- Owner: Skid Row Housing Trust

Technical details
- Structural system: Cantilevered frame
- Floor count: 6
- Floor area: 95,000 square feet (8,800 m^{2})

Design and construction
- Architecture firm: Michael Maltzan Architecture
- Awards and prizes: LEED Platinum, Outstanding affordable project, 2015

Other information
- Number of units: 102 apartments; shops; offices; health centre

Website
- Star-Apartments

The Star Apartments are a purpose-built residential housing complex on Los Angeles' Skid Row that caters to the needs of the long-term homeless. Opened in October 2014, the Star Apartments include 102 units averaging 350 square feet, alongside amenities such as on-site medical services, counseling, fitness and art facilities and a community garden. The complex was developed by the Skid Row Housing Trust, and designed by Los Angeles–based firm Michael Maltzan Architecture. It received LEED Platinum status in August 2015. The building also houses the Los Angeles County Department for Health Services' Housing for Health division.

== Description ==
=== Units ===
The building opened in October 2014. Star Apartments include 102 units averaging 350 square feet, alongside amenities such as on-site medical services, counseling, fitness and art facilities and a community garden.

=== Location ===
The Star Apartments are located in the Skid Row neighborhood, known for its large homeless population. The site of the building has frontage on East 6th Street on the northeast, Wall Street on the southeast, and Maple Avenue to the northwest.

=== Residency ===
Residents of the Star Apartments have been identified as members of the "most vulnerable" population of Los Angeles County, including the chronic homeless and those with a record of frequently utilizing emergency medical services. Each resident is required to pay 30 percent of income or government assistance toward rent. Residency is non-conditional, meaning residents are not required to enroll in assistance programs offered on-site, including addiction counseling, medical assistance, or psychiatric counseling.

The building received a certificate of occupancy in 2014, and was expected to reach full occupancy by November 2014.

In addition to residential tenants, the building is home to the offices of the Los Angeles County Department of Health Services' Housing for Health division headquarters, a US$18 million program with the mandate to house Los Angeles County's 'sickest and most vulnerable' and a mission to "end homelessness in Los Angeles."

=== Developer and architect ===
The complex was designed by Michael Maltzan Architecture (MMA), a Los Angeles–based firm led by architect Michael Maltzan. The developer of the site is the Skid Row Housing Trust. The Star Apartments are the third collaboration between the Skid Row Housing Trust and MMA, and follows the development of the Rainbow and New Carver Apartments projects.

Maltzan has been quoted at length regarding his interest in re-imagining housing for the homeless, including that "the community that lives [in the Star Apartments] should have a similar environment to anybody that could afford something more expensive." He has also alluded to the intent to create interaction among residents through design choices, saying that "What we're trying to create is something that feels like a microcosm of the city itself," and indicating his hope that the Star Apartments could prove a model for future, similar projects.

=== Architecture ===
The six-story, 95,000-square-foot (8,800 m^{2}) building includes 102 apartments built around three distinct use concepts, including street level retail space, space for supportive programming for the Skid Row Housing Trust's primary constituency, and residents. It also accommodates an on-site health clinic, community garden, running track, fitness facilities, and art and library facilities. Roughly 15,000 square feet are allocated as public, community space, and are open to residents of other Skid Row Housing Trust residential complexes. The projected budget for the project was $20.5 million in 2012. Later news reports at the time of the complex's opening put the total cost of construction at $40 million, reportedly following increased costs related to the complexity of installing the pre-fabricated units on the buildings cantilevered frame.

Although the building is primarily known for housing members of Los Angeles' homeless population, it is also notable for its unique construction method—it is thought to be the first multi-unit residential building to utilize entirely pre-fabricated construction. Each of the 102 apartment units were pre-fabricated as self-contained wood-frame units in Boise, Idaho, by Guerdon Enterprises. The interim construction, including plumbing, appliances, and cabinetry, was then shipped to Los Angeles, where it was maneuvered into place by crane before being permanently adjoined to the building superstructure. All of the units were then covered in protective material, and visually unified with a stucco-style coating.

The building awaited LEED certification upon opening to residents. It received LEED Platinum certification in 2015, noted as the outstanding affordable project.

== History ==
The Star Apartments are one of more than 20 residential complexes maintained by the Skid Row Housing Trust. The Skid Row Housing Trust "develops, manages, and operates Permanent Supportive Housing" buildings in the Los Angeles Skid Row area.

The developers received a low income housing tax credit equity from the National Equity Fund and Bank of America for the purpose of financing the project. A decision was made by the architects to incorporate the lot's existing single story commercial structure into the plans, rather than raze the site entirely.

The Star Apartments are part of Los Angeles County's "Housing for Health" initiative to develop 10,000 units of so-called permanent "supportive housing" for individuals suffering from homelessness. Permanent supportive housing attempts to house individuals first before attempting to treat the underlying conditions of homelessness.

== Critical reception ==
The finished construction has been described as "beautiful, modern, and bright," according to National Public Radio. A representative of the American Institute of Architect's Los Angeles chapter said that it "does much to enliven the neighborhood" and that the finished building adds a "sense of urban grace to an area that desperately needs more love.”
