= Toshiko Mori =

Japanese architect

- 森俊子
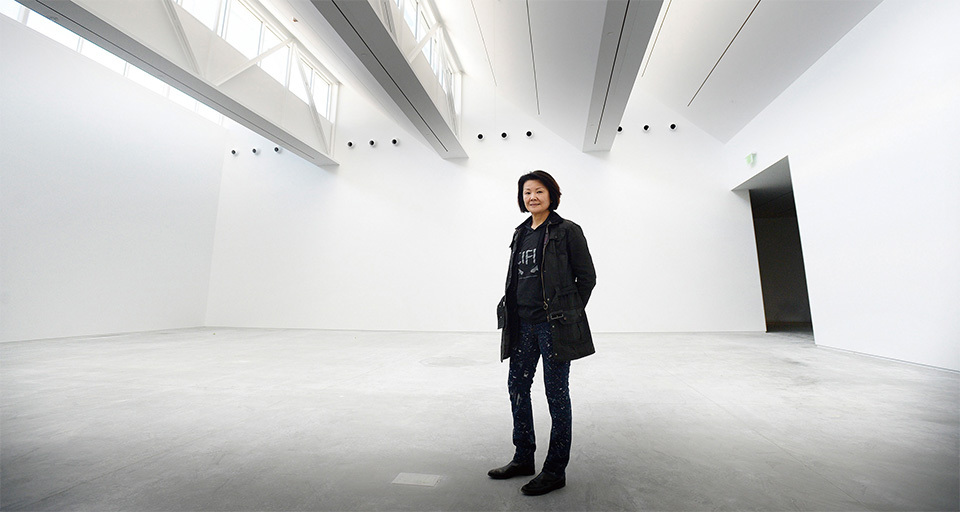
- Born: 1951 (age 74–75); Kobe, Japan
- Education: Cooper Union

Toshiko Mori (born 1951) is a Japanese architect and the founder and principal of New York–based Toshiko Mori Architect, PLLC and Vision Arc. She is also the Robert P. Hubbard Professor in the Practice of Architecture at the Harvard University Graduate School of Design. In 1995, she became the first female faculty member to receive tenure at the GSD.

== Education ==
Mori graduated from Cooper Union in 1971, the Cooper Union School of Architecture in 1976. She then received an Honorary MArch from Harvard Graduate School of Design, in 1996.

== Career ==
Prior to establishing her own firm, Mori worked for Edward Larrabee Barnes. She is licensed as an architect in Connecticut, Florida, Maine, Massachusetts, Michigan, Minnesota, Missouri, New Jersey, New York, Rhode Island, and Washington, D.C. At the Harvard University Graduate School of Design, she received tenure in 1995 and chaired the Department of Architecture from 2002 to 2008. Mori has taught at the graduate level at Cooper Union School of Architecture, Columbia University, and Yale University.

Mori is known for her "concern with material innovation and conceptual clarity." Her projects include the A.R.T. New York theater, the canopy at the Brooklyn Children's Museum, Pembroke Hall at Brown University, exhibit design at MoMA and the Cooper Hewitt, Smithsonian Design Museum, and numerous residential projects in the United States, Taiwan, China, and Austria.

As a member of the World Economic Forum's Global Agenda Council on the Future of Cities, Mori leads research and inquiry into sustainable architecture, enhancing cities' livability, and creating efficient urban services. Mori is also on the board of directors of Architecture For Humanity, a nonprofit dedicated to design innovation and community involvement.

In 2015, Mori's ecological cultural center in the Senegalese village of Sinthian opened. The building's pitched roof is a sophisticated water-collection system that siphons rainwater into a cistern, providing 30 percent of Sinthian's overall consumption. In 2019, her Fass school and teachers' residence in the same country was opened.

Mori is an Independent Member of the board of directors at Dassault Systèmes.

== Recognition ==
Mori has been the recipient of numerous international awards and honors, and her work has been widely exhibited and published. She was awarded the Cooper Union's inaugural John Hejduk Award in 2003. In 2005, she received the Academy Award in Architecture from the American Academy of Arts and Letters, as well as the Medal of Honor from the American Institute of Architects New York Chapter. Her projects have been exhibited in the Cooper-Hewitt National Design Museum's "Design Life Now: National Design Triennial 2006" and at the Guggenheim Museum.

A monograph of her work, Toshiko Mori Architect, was published by Monacelli Press in 2008. She has contributed to many publications, as well as editing a volume on material and fabrication research, Immaterial/Ultramaterial.

In 2014, Mori was recognized for her work designing the Poe Park Visitor Center, a winning site of Built by Women New York City, a competition launched by the Beverly Willis Architecture Foundation during the fall of 2014 to identify outstanding and diverse sites and spaces designed, engineered and built by women.

=== Awards and honors ===
- 2024- Asia Society 2024 Asia Arts Game Changer Award
- 2024- Architectural Digest's 2024 AD100 Hall of Fame
- 2023- Philip Hiss Award
- 2023- Elle Decor's 2023 A-List Titans
- 2023- Architectural Digest's 2023 AD100 Hall of Fame
- 2023- The Plan Award for best educational facilities, Fass School, Senegal
- 2023- Masterworks 2023 Award for Best Restoration, Brooklyn Public Library, Central Branch Renovation
- 2022- Architectural Digest's 2022 AD100 Hall of Fame
- 2021- AIA 2021 Architecture Award: Fass School + Teachers' Residence
- 2021- Elle Decor's 2021 A-List Titans
- 2021- Architectural Digest's 2021 AD100
- 2020- Louis Auchincloss Prize from the Museum of the City of New York
- 2020-Architizer A+ Award, Jury's Pick, Institutional - Primary and High Schools: Fass School + Teachers' Residence
- 2020- Wright Spirit Award, Professional Category, Eleanor & Wilson Greatbatch Pavilion
- 2020- American Academy of Arts and Letters: Toshiko Mori inducted as one of thirteen new members
- 2020- Architectural Digest's 2020 AD100

- 2019 Louis Auchincloss Prize
- 2019 ACSA Topaz Medallion for Excellence in Architectural Education Award
- 2017 AIA National 2017 Institute Honor Awards, Thread: Artists' Residency + Cultural Center
- 2016 Architectural Digest's 2017 AD100
- 2016 The Plan Award 2016 winner: Culture, Thread: Artists' Residency + Cultural Center
- 2016 Aga Khan 2014-2016 Award finalist, Thread: Artists' Residency + Cultural Center
- 2016 University of Buffalo, School of Architecture and Planning Dean's Medal
- 2016 Architizer A+ Award: Architecture + Community, Thread: Artists' Residency + Cultural Center
- 2016 Architizer A+ Award: Architecture + Humanitarianism, Thread: Artists' Residency + Cultural Center
- 2016 Architizer A+ Awards finalist, Peter Freeman Gallery
- 2015 Architectural Digest 2016 AD100
- 2015 AIA New York State Award of Merit, House on Maine Coast
- 2014 AIA New York Chapter Projects Merit Award, Sinthian Cultural Center and Artists' Residence
- 2014 AIA New York Chapter Architecture Merit Award, House in Ghent
- 2013 AIA New York Chapter Interiors Honor Award, Sean Kelly Gallery
- 2013 Kathy and Howard J. Aibel Award, A.R.T./New York Spring Benefit
- 2012 American Architecture Awards, Syracuse Center of Excellence
- 2010 World Architecture Festival Award Finalist, Eleanor and Wilson Greatbatch Pavilion
- 2009 AIA Buffalo/Western New York Honor Award, Eleanor & Wilson Greatbatch Pavilion
- 2009 AIA New York State Award of Excellence, Newspaper Café
- 2008 AIA New York State Award of Excellence, Addition to House on the Gulf of Mexico I
- 2005 American Institute of Architects/New York Chapter Medal of Honor
- 2005 Academy Award in Architecture, American Academy of Arts and Letters
- 2003 Cooper Union Inaugural John Hejduk Award
- 2002 American Academy of Rome: Bernoudy Visiting Architect Fellowship

== Exhibitions ==
- 2016 Miami & the Tropical World, Korach Gallery, University of Miami – Miami, Florida
- 2015 Afrika, Louisiana Museum – Humlebæk, Denmark
- 2015 Built x Women NYC, The Center for Architecture, New York, New York
- 2014 Office US (Sinthian Cultural Center/ Thread), Fourteenth International Architecture Exhibition, la Biennale di Venezia – Venice, Italy
- 2012 Dialogue in Detail, Thirteenth International Architecture Exhibition, la Biennale di Venezia – Venice, Italy
- 2010 Contemplating the Void: Interventions in the Guggenheim Museum, Guggenheim Museum – New York, New York
- 2009 Detour Tokyo, Moleskin – Tokyo, Japan

== Major works ==
- Fass School and Teachers' Residence – Fass, Senegal (2019)
- Stephen Robert '62 Hall, Watson Institute, Brown University – Providence, Rhode Island (2018)
- Center for Maine Contemporary Art – Rockland, Maine (2013–2016)
- Institute at Brown for Environment and Society, Brown University – Providence, Rhode Island (2013)
- Novartis Institutes for Biomedical Research Laboratory Building – Cambridge, Massachusetts (2011–2015)
- Paracoustica: Portable Concert Hall (2011-)
- Brooklyn Public Library – Brooklyn, New York (2009)
- Hudson Park and Boulevard at 34th Street–Hudson Yards station – MTA Canopies and Café, New York, New York (2008)
- Pembroke Hall, Brown University – Providence, Rhode Island (2008)
- Thread – Sinthian, Senegal (2012–2015)
- Syracuse Center of Excellence – Syracuse University, Syracuse New York (2005–2010)
- Eleanor and Wilson Greatbatch Pavilion, Darwin D. Martin House – Buffalo, New York (2002–2009)
- New York University Masterplan – New York, New York (2007)
- The Newspaper Café – Jinhua, China (2004–2007)

=== Gallery ===
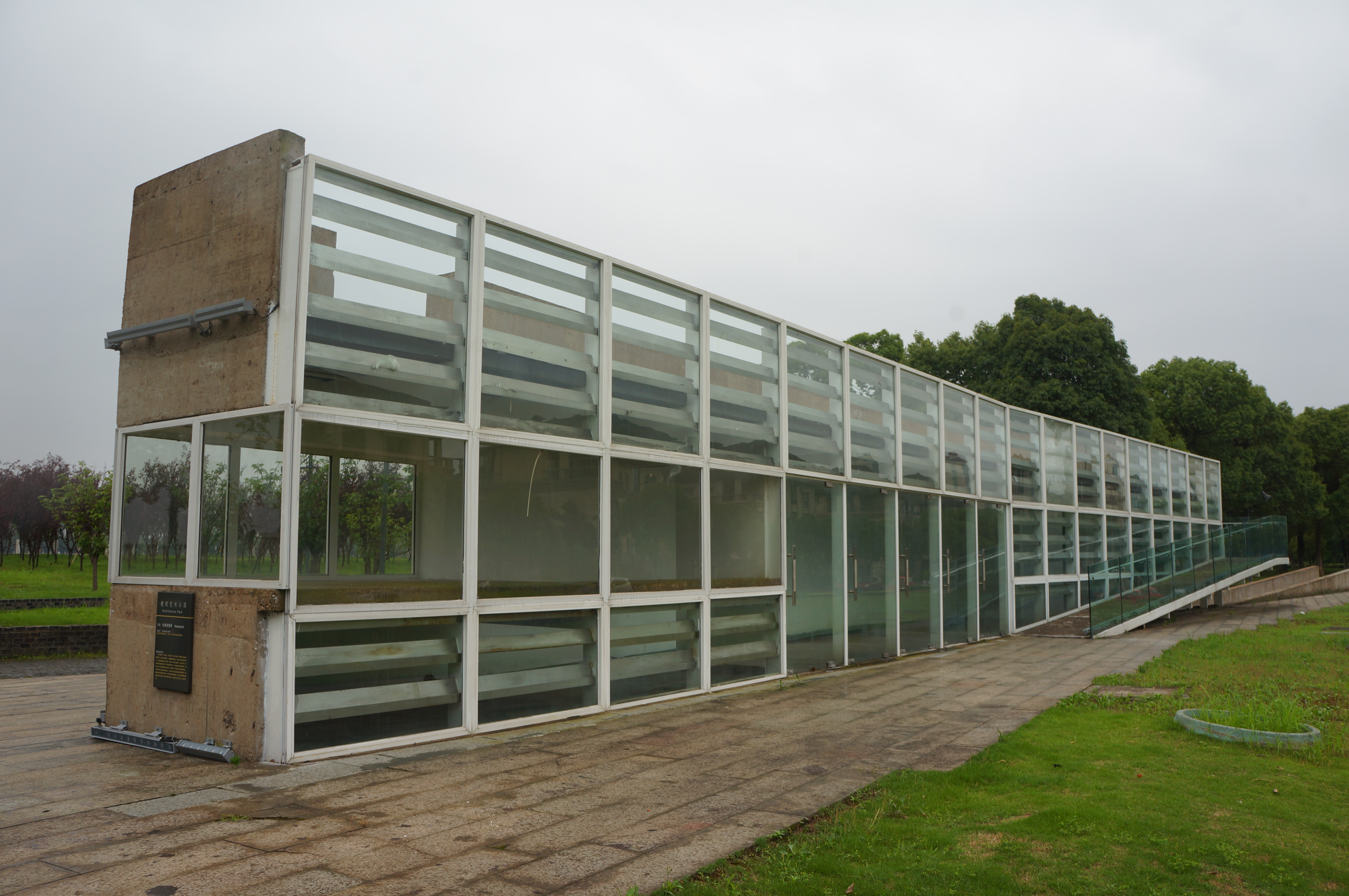
"Newsstand" designed by Mori presented at Jinhua Architecture Park (2007)

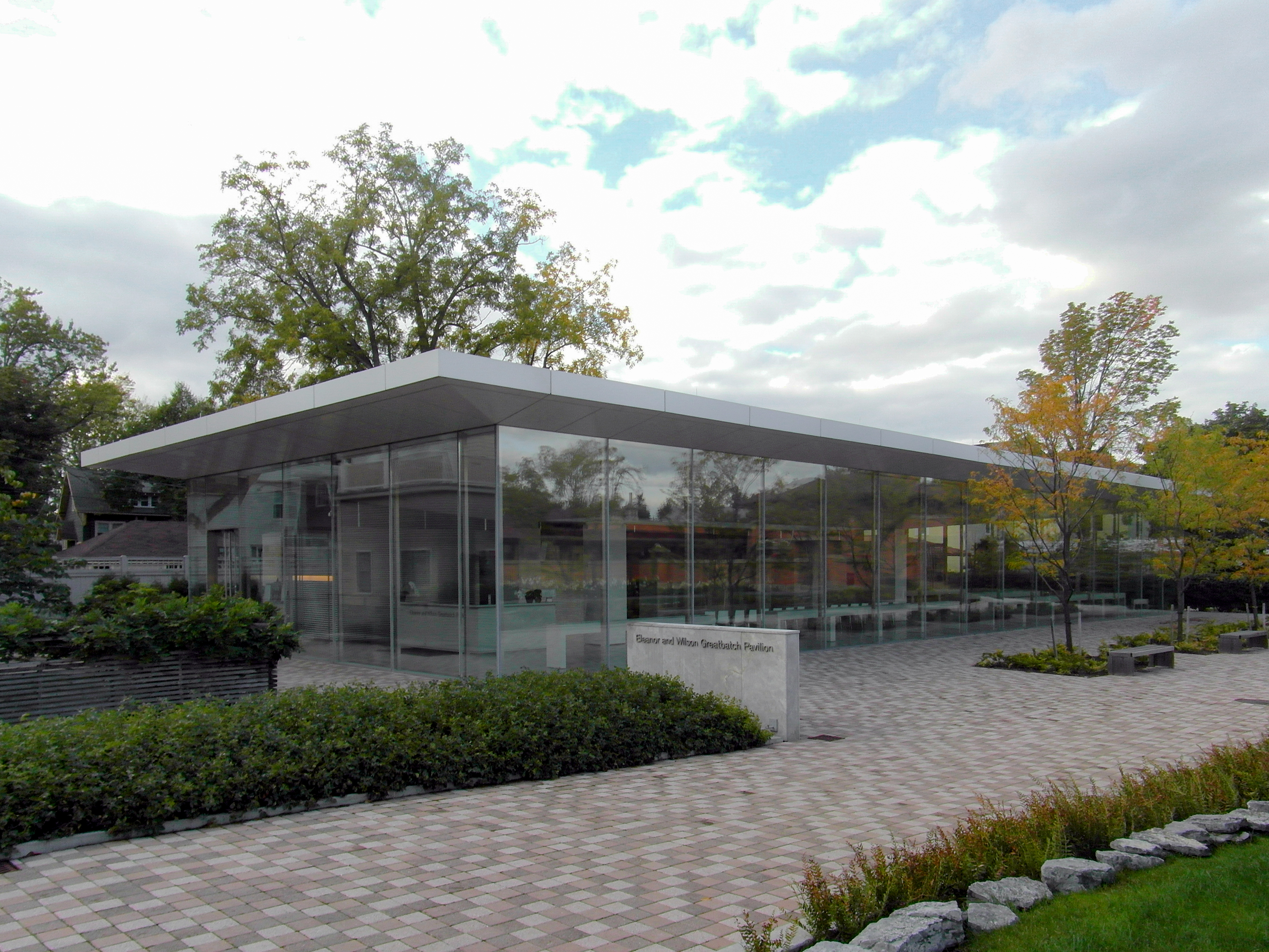
Greatbatch Pavilion, Darwin D. Martin House (2002–09)

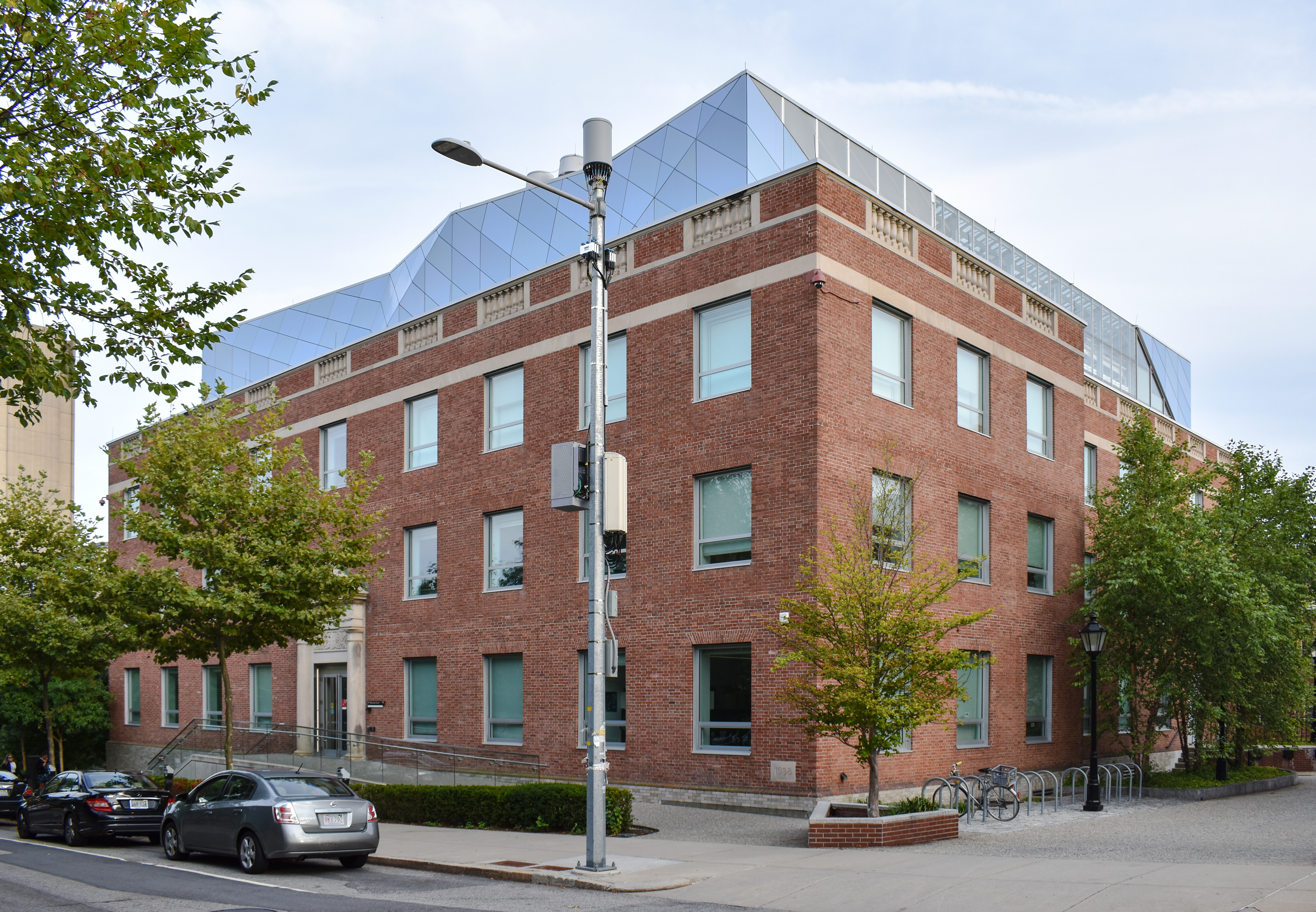
Institute at Brown for Environment and Society, Brown University (2013)

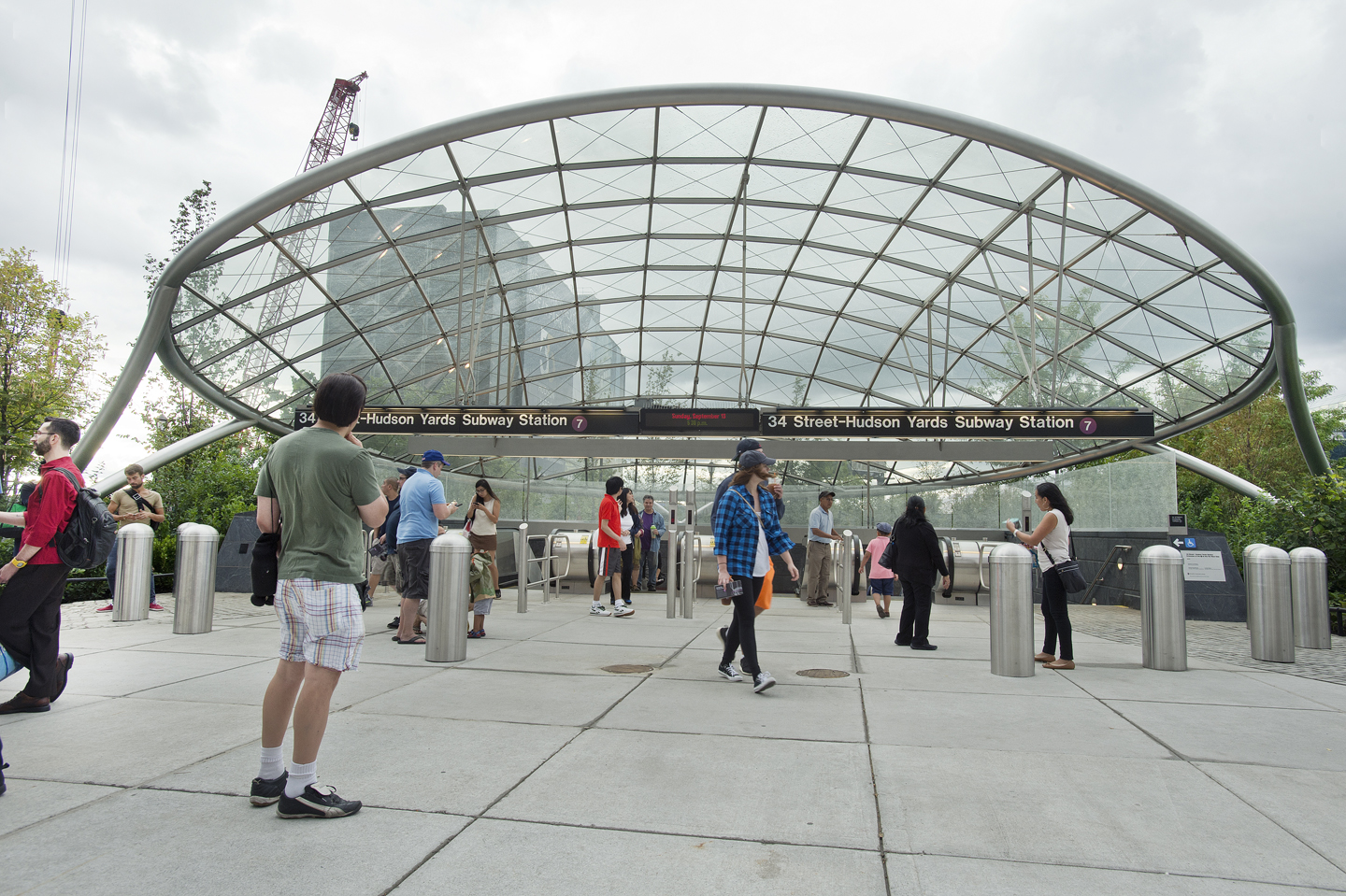
MTA Canopies, Hudson Park (2015)

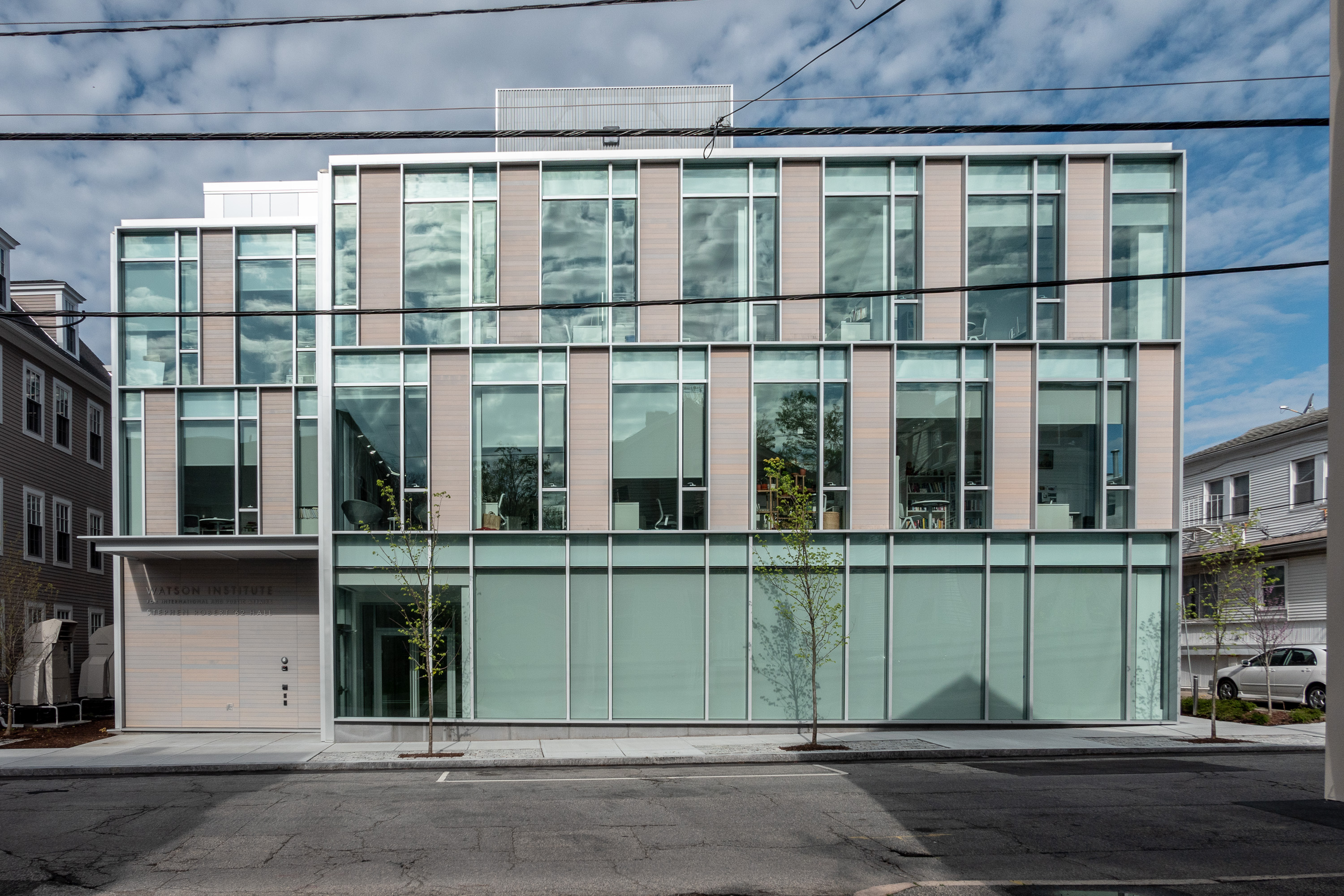
Stephen Robert '62 Hall, Watson Institute, Brown University (2018)

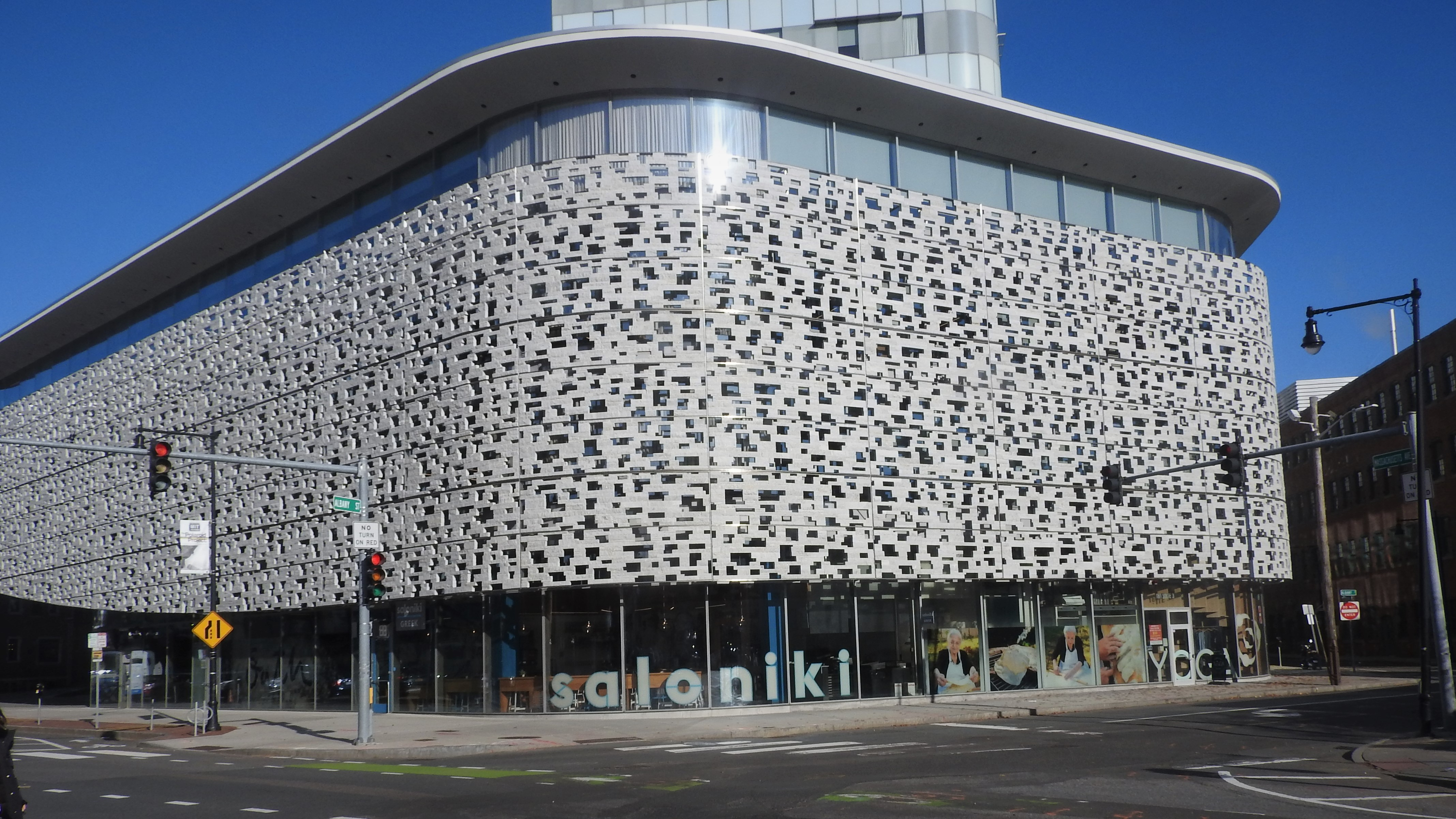
Novartis campus, Cambridge, MA (2015)
