= HHF Architects =

Swiss architectural firm, founded 2003

HHF Architects is an architectural practice established in Basel, Switzerland by Tilo Herlach, Simon Hartmann, and Simon Frommenwiler, in 2003.

== History ==
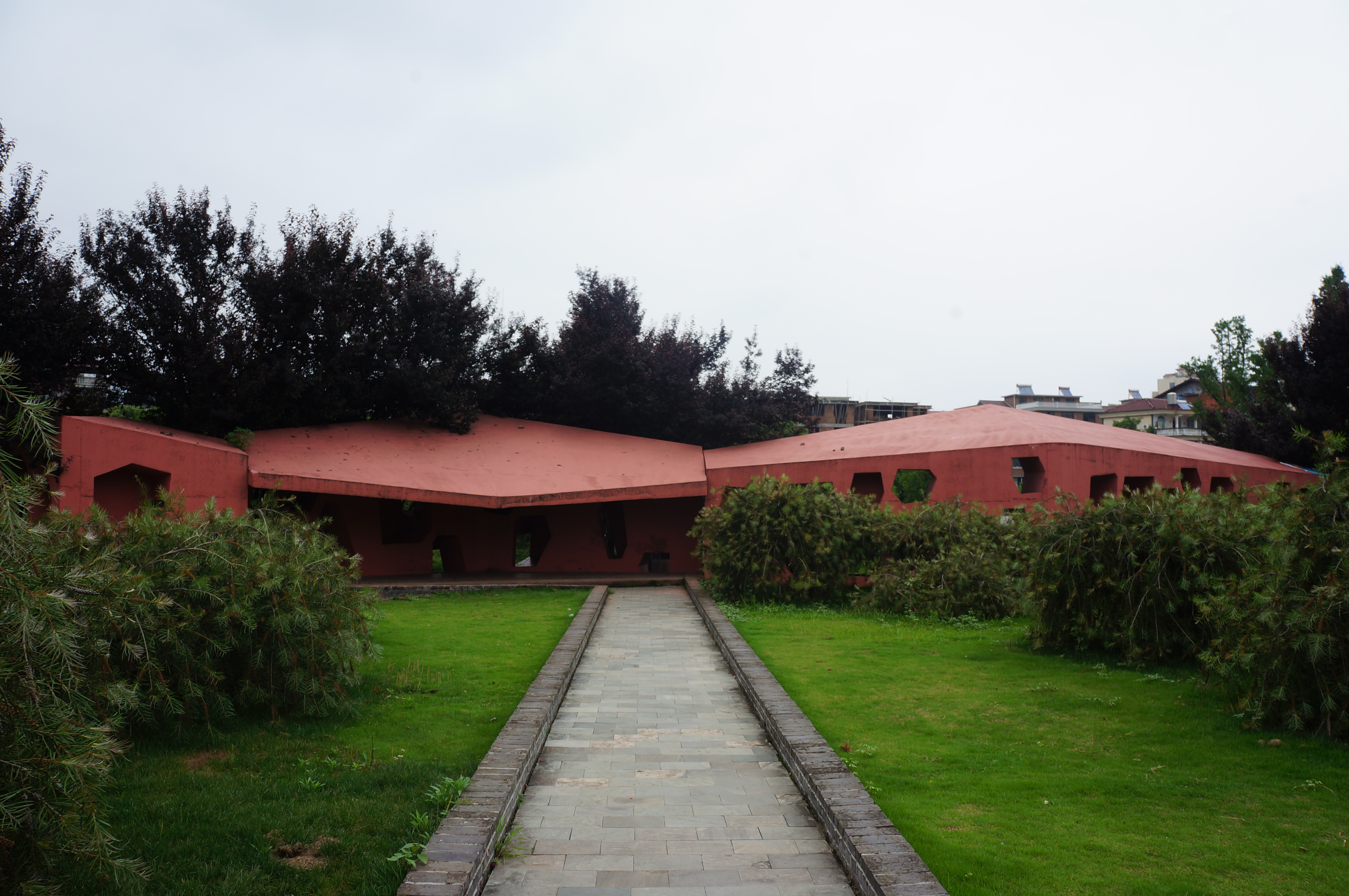
HHF's work "Playground" at Jinhua Architecture Park

The practice has built projects in Switzerland, China, Germany, France, Mexico and the United States. Their projects encompass a broad spectrum, including new buildings like the "Labels 2" fashion center in Berlin, interior design, planning tasks like the master plans for the public spaces of the Praille-Acacias-Vernets site in Geneva and La Défense, near Paris, and the development plan for Unterfeld in Zug, Switzerland, as well as objects in the public realm like "Baby Dragon" in China or the "Espinazo del Diablo" viewing platform on the "Ruta del Peregrino" in the Mexican state of Jalisco. HHF Architects intentionally seek close and substantive collaboration with artists and other architects. It is within this context that group projects receiving worldwide attention have emerged, such as the Mexican pilgrimage route "Ruta del Peregrino" and the fruitful collaboration with the Chinese conceptual artist Ai Weiwei, which has been ongoing since 2005.

Shortly after of the office was established, the first works were already being shown at national and international architecture exhibitions. In 2005 HHF were invited to design a contribution to the "Jinhua Architecture and Arts Park" for the Hong Kong & Shenzhen Bi-City Biennale of Urbanism/Architecture. An invitation followed in 2007 to officially represent Switzerland at the 7th International Architecture Biennale of São Paulo. In 2011 the works created in collaboration with Ai Weiwei were shown as part of the exhibition Ai Weiwei – Art / Architecture at Kunsthaus Bregenz in Austria. The German Architecture Museum (DAM) in Frankfurt am Main showed "Labels 2" in 2012 as part of the exhibition The 23 Best Buildings. HHF was invited to the 13th, 14th and 16th Venice Biennale of Architecture, and the Chicago Architecture Biennial 2017. Their work is part of the permanent collections of Centre Georges Pompidou in Paris, the Architekturmuseum of the Technical University of Munich at the Pinakothek der Moderne in Munich, and the Heinz Architectural Center at the Carnegie Museum of Art in Pittsburgh.

Alongside numerous other national and international distinctions, HHF was named to the "Design Vanguard 2010" by Architectural Record. In 2012, HHF were distinguished with an important Wallpaper Design Award, for which they had also been nominated in 2010. HHF where honored with an American Architecture Award in 2009 and 2013.

In addition to building, architectural education is of utmost importance to the firm's principals. They were visiting professors at the University of Innsbruck, the Karlsruhe Institute of Technology KIT, MIT School of Architecture and Planning in Cambridge, and have been guest lecturers at the UIA in Mexico City as well as guest critics at numerous universities worldwide. Simon Frommenwiler has been teaching as a visiting professor at École nationale supérieure d'architecture de Strasbourg from 2011 until 2018. Simon Hartmann has been teaching as professor of design at the HTA Fribourg from 2009 until 2017 and is William Henry Bishop Visiting Professor at Yale School of Architecture, 2018. Since fall 2018, Tilo Herlach, Simon Frommenwiler and Simon Hartmann are teaching at Harvard Graduate School of Design.

== Profile ==
- Established 2003
- Legal form: GmbH
- Partners: Tilo Herlach, Simon Hartmann, Simon Frommenwiler
- Managing Director and Associate: Cella Hubel
- Associates: David Gregori y Ribes, Mariana Santana
- Employees: 25–30 (as of September 2018)
- The team consists of architects, urban designers, designers and drafters

== Buildings and projects (selected) ==
- 2017 – Poissy Galore, observatory and museum in Carrières-Sous-Poissy, Paris, France, in collaboration with AWP, Paris
- 2016 – House H, private residence, Starnberg, Germany
- 2016 – Byfangweg, apartment building, Basel, Switzerland
- 2015 – Lichtstrasse, housing and restaurant, Basel, Switzerland
- 2013 – House C, private residence, Ziefen, Switzerland
- 2013 – Master plan for all public spaces of La Défense, Hauts-de-Seine, France, in collaboration with AWP, Paris
- 2011 – Master plan for the public spaces and urban mobility, Praille-Acacias-Vernets, Geneva, Switzerland
- 2011 – House D, Nuglar, Switzerland
- 2011 – Guesthouse, Ancram, New York, USA, in collaboration with Ai Weiwei
- 2011 – Apartment Quai de Valmy, Paris, France, in collaboration with AWP, Paris
- 2010 – Lookout Point on the Ruta del Peregrino, Mexico
- 2010 – Labels 2 Fashion Center, Berlin, Germany
- 2009 – Sonvida residential development, Bottmingen, Switzerland, with ARchos Architektur
- 2009 – Confiserie Bachmann, Basel, Switzerland
- 2008 – Artfarm, gallery and art storage for Chambers Fine Art, New York, USA, in collaboration with Ai Weiwei
- 2008 – Tsai Residence, New York, USA, in collaboration with Ai Weiwei
- 2008 – Overall urban concept for Saarbrücken, Germany, in collaboration with Hans Wirz, Jacques Degermann, and Joel Bertrand
- 2008 – Grand Traiano Art Complex, Grottaferrata, Province of Rome, Italy, in collaboration with Johnston Marklee Architects
- 2008 – Ordos 100, HHF House, Inner Mongolia, China
- 2008 – Kirschgarten Mensa, cafeteria in Kirschgarten secondary school, Basel, Switzerland
- 2007 – Dune House, Inner Mongolia, China
- 2005 – Treehouse, Guesthouse for the Waterville Golf Resort, Lijiang, Yunnan Province, China, in collaboration with Ai Weiwei (shell construction)
- 2005 – Baby Dragon – Pavilion for children, Jinhua Architecture Park, China
- 2003 – Master plan for Sonvida residential development, Bottmingen, Switzerland, in collaboration with ARchos Architektur

== Distinctions (selected) ==
- 2018 – Winner of the ArchiDesignClub Award for the French Cultural Building of the Year
- 2017 – Inclusion in the architecture collection of the Carnegie Museum of Art, Pittsburgh
- 2016 – Nomination for the European Union Prize for Contemporary Architecture "Mies van der Rohe Award"
- 2015 – Swiss Architecture Award, 1st Prize, in the category Housing
- 2014 – Inclusion in the collection of the Architecture Museum of the Technical University of Munich, Pinakothek der Moderne, Munich, Germany
- 2014 – Nomination for the best single family house ("Das beste Einfamilienhaus" '14) by the Swiss magazine "Das ideale Heim"
- 2013 – Award for excellent architecture from Kanton Basel-Landschaft, Kanton Basel-Stadt
- 2013 – Award for the best new building from the Basel Heritage Protection
- 2013 – Architekturpreis Berlin, Germany
- 2013 – American Architecture Award for Guesthouse, Ancram, NY, USA
- 2013 – 1. Prize, buildings of the year 2013 award ("Häuser des Jahres 2013") by the German Architecture Museum and Callwey Verlag
- 2013 – Best Architects 14 Award
- 2012 – WAN 21 for 21 Award
- 2012 – AIT-Award 2012 for Public Buildings
- 2012 – Wallpaper (magazine) Design Award
- 2012 – Nomination for Velux Daylight Award
- 2011 – Inclusion in the collection Centre Georges Pompidou
- 2010 – Design Vanguard Award 2010 (Chernikov Prize)
- 2010 – Swiss Art Awards 2010 Winner
- 2010 – Best Architects 11 Award
- 2010 – Wallpaper (magazine) Design Award, nomination
- 2010 – Contractworld Award
- 2009 – American Architecture Award for Tsai Residence, Ancram, NY, USA
- 2009 – Best Architects 10 Gold Award
- 2008 – Europe 40 under 40 award, European Centre for Architecture Art Design and Urban Studies
- 2008 – Award for Best Architects 09 from the magazine Hochparterre, Swiss television and the Museum für Gestaltung (Museum for Design), Zurich
- 2008 – Gold Award for excellent architecture from Kanton Basel-Landschaft, Kanton Basel-Stadt, Basel, Switzerland
- 2008 – Best Architects 09 award

== Exhibitions (selected) ==
- 2018 – Contribution to the Luxembourg Pavilion, The architecture of a common ground, 16th Venice Biennale of Architecture, Venice, Italy
- 2017 – Chicago Architecture Biennial, Chicago, United States
- 2017 – Swiss Architects Abroad, S AM Swiss Architecture Museum, Basel
- 2016 – Topotek 1: Exhibition/Munich, Architekturgalerie München, Munich
- 2016 – Schweizweit, S AM Swiss Architecture Museum, Basel
- 2015 – The Swiss Architecture Award, Zurich, Switzerland
- 2015 – Architettura in Svizzera. Dialogo tra storia e contemporaneità, Chiostro di Palazzo Platamone, Catania, Italy
- 2015 – Sacri Monti e altre storie Architettura, Milan Triennale, Castello di Masnago, Varese, Italy
- 2015 – Constructing Film. Swiss Architecture in the Moving Image, S AM Swiss Architecture Museum, Basel, Switzerland
- 2015 – Une histoire, art, architecture et design, des années 80 à aujourd'hui, Centre Georges Pompidou, Paris, France
- 2014 – HHF—Unfinished, Architekturgalerie Munich, Germany
- 2014 – Architecture Week Prague, Czech Republic
- 2014 – Co-Curation of the Montenegro Pavilion, 14th Venice Biennale of Architecture, Venice, Italy
- 2014 – Greek Tourism is not in Crisis, contribution to the Greek Pavilion, 14th Venice Biennale of Architecture, Venice, Italy
- 2014 – CANactions 2014, Kiew, Ukraine
- 2014 – Show and Tell – Architekturgeschichte(n) aus der Sammlung, Pinakothek der Moderne, Architecture Museum of the Technical University of Munich
- 2013 – Cut'n'Paste: From Architectural Assemblage to Collage City, MOMA, New York, United States
- 2013 – Lookout Architecture with a View, S AM Swiss Architecture Museum, Basel, Switzerland
- 2013 – Buildings of the Year 2013, German Architecture Museum, Frankfurt am Main, Germany
- 2013 – Architekturpreis Berlin 2013, Labels 2, Kutscherhaus, Berlin, Germany
- 2013 – 14. Internationale Architektur Biennale Buenos Aires, Argentina
- 2013 – La Défense 2020, exhibition, Cœur Défense, Parvis de La Défense, Hauts-de-Seine, France
- 2013 – Monografische Ausstellung, presentation Unterfeld, Baar, Switzerland
- 2013 – Daueraustellung, Pavillon de l'Arsenal, Paris, France
- 2013 – Paris la nuit, Pavillon de l'Arsenal, Paris, France
- 2013 – Building Images, Photography Focusing on Swiss Architecture, S AM Swiss Architecture Museum, Basel, Switzerland
- 2013 – White Cube, Green Maze: New Art Landscapes, Yale School of Architecture, New Haven, United States
- 2012 – GLOBAL Design NYU London, The Building Centre, London, UK
- 2012 – White Cube, Green Maze: New Art Landscapes, Carnegie Museum of Art, Pittsburgh, United States
- 2012 – Invitation to the 13th Venice Biennale of Architecture, Italy
- 2012 – WAN 21 for 21 awards exhibition, London, UK
- 2012 – Ai Weiwei's Five Houses, AIA Architecture Center Houston, United States
- 2012 – Die 23 besten Bauten in Deutschland, German Architecture Museum, Frankfurt am Main, Germany
- 2011 – Participation in the exhibition Tatiana Bilbao, Centre Pompidou, Paris, France
- 2011 – Kunsthaus Bregenz, Austria
- 2011 – Arquitectura Contemporánea Suiza, Cádiz, Spain
- 2011 – Le PAV s’expose, Geneva, Switzerland
- 2010 – Swiss Art Awards, Swiss Federal Office of Culture, Basel, Switzerland
- 2009 – Arch/Scapes, Hong Kong & Shenzhen Bi-City Biennale of Urbanism / Architecture, Hong Kong
- 2009 – Arch/Scapes, Today Art Museum, Beijing, China
- 2009 – New American Architecture, Chicago, United States
- 2009 – Europe 40 under 40, Athens, Greece and Florence, Italy
- 2008 – CAUE 92 (Conseil d'architecture, d'urbanisme et de l'environnement des Hauts-de-Seine), Sceaux, Hauts-de-Seine, France
- 2008 – Arch/Scapes, Swiss Architecture Museum, Basel
- 2007 – Arch/Scapes, official Swiss contribution to the 7th International Architecture Biennale of São Paulo
- 2006 – China Contemporary, Nederlands Architecture Institute, Rotterdam, Netherlands
- 2005 – Shenzhen Biennale of Urbanism and Architecture, Shenzhen, China

== Publications (selected) ==
- Landscape of Faith: Interventions Along the Mexican Pilgrimage Route, Lars Müller, 2018, ISBN 978-3-03778-499-0
- Grundrissfibel, Museumsbauten, Edition Hochparterre, Zürich, 2017, ISBN 978-3-909928-42-2
- NZZ yearbook Real Estate, Edition 2017/18, NZZ Fachmedien, Luzern, 2017, ISBN 978-3-03810-314-1
- Architekturpädagogiken, Hochschule Luzern, Park Books, Zürich, 2017, ISBN 978-3-03860-065-7
- Make New History, Chicago Biennial, Lars Müller, Zurich, 2017, ISBN 978-3-03778-535-5
- Zukunftsweisend Umbauen, hindernisfrei Wohnen, CMV, Basel, 2017, ISBN 978-3-85616-842-1
- Architekturführer Deutschland, DOM Publishers, 2017, ISBN 978-3-86922-549-4
- Spektakuläre Häuser, DVA, München, 2017, ISBN 978-3-421-04048-0
- Global Design, Prestel, Munich – London – New York, 2015, ISBN 978-3-7913-5358-6
- HHF—Unfinished, 176 pages, HHF, Basel, 2014, ISBN 978-3-033-04706-8
- Fundamentals, 14th International Architecture Exhibition, La Biennale di Venezia, 576 pages, Marsilio, Venezia, 2014, ISBN 978-88-317-1869-1
- Show & Tell, Collecting Architecture, 240 pages, Hatje Cantz, 2014, ISBN 978-3-7757-3801-9
- Das beste Einfamilienhaus, 106 pages, Archithema Verlag, 2014, ISBN 978-3-9522994-6-3
- Architecture Now! 9, 480 pages, Taschen, 2013, ISBN 978-3-8365-3899-2
- Best Architects 14, 496 pages, Zinnobergruen, Düsseldorf, 2013, ISBN 978-3-9811174-8-6
- Lookout, Architecture with a View, S AM Swiss Architecture Museum, 116 pages, CMV, 2013, ISBN 978-3-85616-633-5
- Where Architects Work, 256 pages, Birkhäuser, Bauwelt, 2013, ISBN 978-3-03821-412-0
- Häuser des Jahres, 273 pages, Callwey, 2013, ISBN 978-3-7667-2037-5
- Building Images, S AM Swiss Architecture Museum, 197 pages, CMV, 2013, ISBN 978-3-85616-582-6
- White Cube Green Maze: New Art Landscapes, University of California Press, 2012, ISBN 978-0-5202-7440-2
- HHF Architects, 335 pages, Archilife Publishers, Seoul, 2012, ISBN 978-89-964508-3-2
- Ruta del Peregrino: A Photographic Essay by Iwan Baan, 13th Venice Architecture Biennale, 2012, ISBN 978-3-0330-3590-4
- Deutsches Architekturjahrbuch / German Architectural Annual 2011|12. Prestel Verlag, Munich, 2011, ISBN 978-3-7913-5135-3
- Architecture Dialogues: Positions – Concepts – Visions, Niggli Verlag, 2011, ISBN 978-3-7212-0802-3
- Ai Weiwei: Art | Architecture, Verlag der Buchhandlung Walther König, 2011, ISBN 978-3-8633-5041-3
- Old & New: Design Manual for Revitalizing Existing Buildings, Birkhäuser Verlag, 2010, ISBN 978-3-0346-05250
- Shopping 1 Architecture Now!, Taschen Verlag, 2010, ISBN 978-3-8365-1738-6
- Houses 2 Architecture Now!, Taschen Verlag, 2011, ISBN 978-3-8365-1973-1
- AsBuilt, Princeton University Press, 2010
- Architecture Now! 7, Taschen Verlag, 2010, ISBN 978-38365-1736-2
- Ai Weiwei: Architecture, daab Verlag, 2010, ISBN 978-39425-9701-2
- Gallerie d’Arte, Motta Architecture, 2009, ISBN 978-8-8611-6113-9
- Best Architects 10, Zinnobergrün, 2009, ISBN 978-3-9811-1743-1
- Architecture in China, Taschen Verlag, 2007, ISBN 978-3-8228-5264-4
- Architecture Now! 5, Taschen Verlag, 09.07, ISBN 978-3-8228-1810-7
- Atmosphere: The Shape of Things to Come, Birkhäuser Verlag, 2007, ISBN 978-3-7643-8387-9
- Best Architects 09, Zinnobergrün, 2008, ISBN 978-3-9811-1742-4
