= Michael Maltzan =

American architect

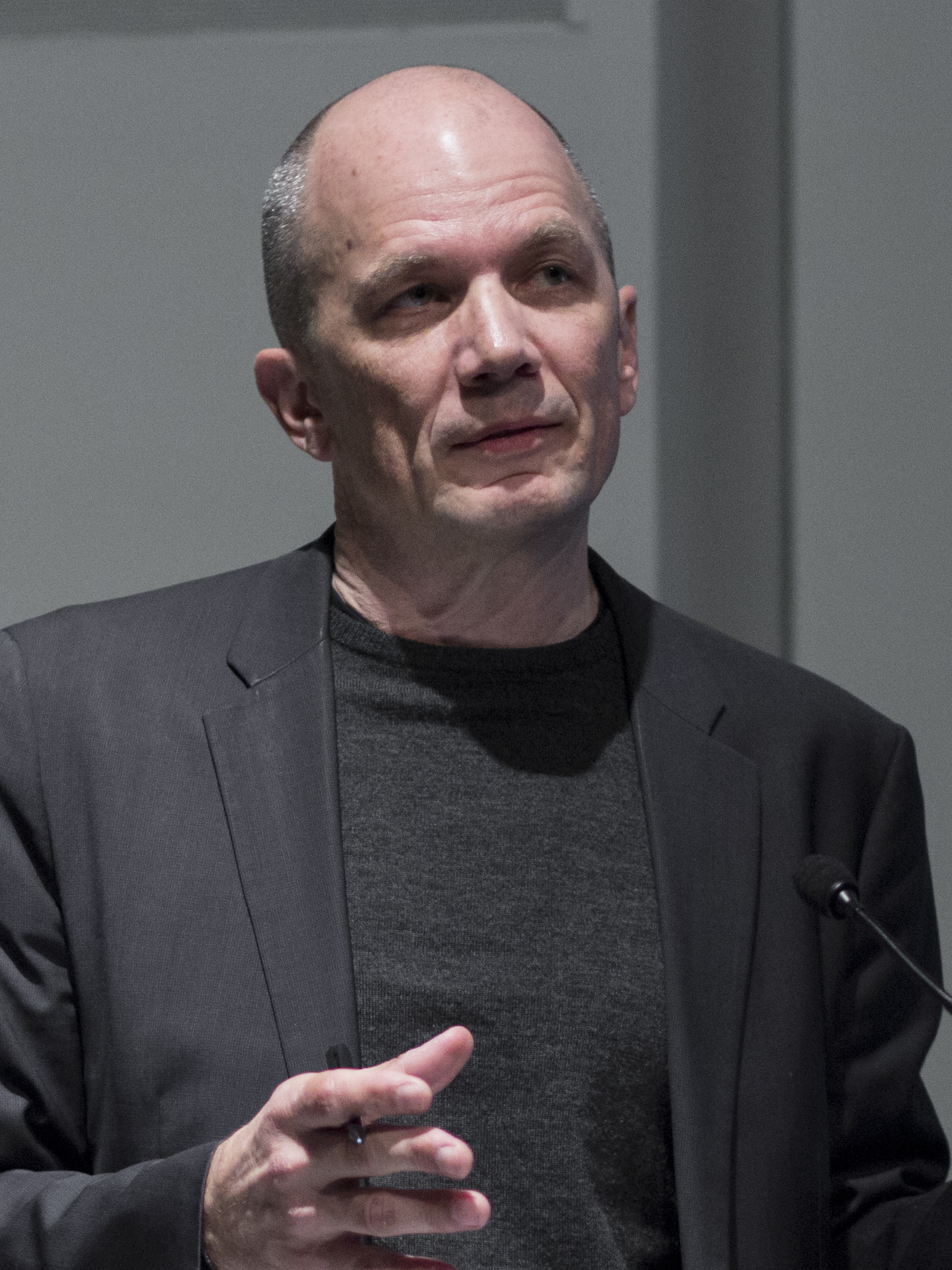
- Born: October 10, 1959 (age 66); United States
- Education: Rhode Island School of Design Harvard University
- Occupation: Architect
- Practice: Michael Maltzan Architecture, Inc.
- Buildings: Sixth Street Viaduct, Star Apartments One Santa Fe, Inner-City Arts, New Carver Apartments, MoMA-QNS

Michael Maltzan is the principal architect at Michael Maltzan Architecture (MMA), a Los Angeles–based architecture firm. He received a Master of Architecture degree from Harvard University and both a Bachelor of Architecture degree and a Bachelor of Fine Arts degree from the Rhode Island School of Design. Maltzan was selected as a Fellow of the American Institute of Architects in 2007.

== Early life and education ==
Born near Levittown on Long Island, Maltzan was one of five children. He first studied drafting in high school in Hebron, Connecticut.

== Career ==
Maltzan founded Michael Maltzan Architecture, Inc. in 1995, with offices in Silver Lake, Los Angeles. His first solo project was completed in 1995 in the Downtown Los Angeles warehouse district. In 1996, he was commissioned to design a $2 million house in Beverly Hills for entertainment lawyer Alan Hergott.

In 1998, Ann Philbin chose Maltzan as architect for a renovation of the Hammer Museum in Westwood, Los Angeles. In 1999, curator Terence Riley included him in the Museum of Modern Art’s influential exhibition “The Un-Private House.”

In 2012, Maltzan and engineering firm HNTB were selected through an international competition to design the Sixth Street Viaduct. The bridge replaced the original 1932 Sixth Street Viaduct that suffered from alkali-silica reaction, which made the bridge vulnerable to seismic failure. The bridge design is known as “The Ribbon of Light” and is the largest bridge project in the history of Los Angeles. The bridge opened to the public on July 9, 2022.

== Recognition ==
Maltzan was awarded the American Academy of Arts and Letters Award in Architecture in 2012 and the Society of Architectural Historians Change Agent Award in 2021. He received the 2016 AIA Los Angeles Gold Medal and was elected to the National Academy of Design in 2020. He was inducted as a member of the American Academy of Arts and Letters in 2023. [20] Michael was awarded the 2025 Cooper Hewitt National Design Award in Architecture

Maltzan serves on the Deans leadership council at the Harvard Graduate School of Design and the Visiting Committee to the GSD. He was featured in the Canadian Centre for Architecture’s 2019 film, What It Takes to Make a Home, delivered the 20th Annual John T. Dunlop Lecture for the Joint Center for Housing Studies of Harvard University, and his work was named One of the 25 Best Inventions of 2015 by Time Magazine.

== Notable projects ==
- RIT Performing Arts Center, Rochester, NY (2026)
- New Vassar residence hall, MIT, Cambridge, MA (2021)
- Qaumajuq - Inuit Art Centre, Winnipeg, Canada (2020)
- Rice University Moody Center for the Arts, Houston, TX (2016)
- Crest Apartments, Los Angeles, CA (2016)
- One Santa Fe, Los Angeles, CA (2015)
- Hammer Museum John V. Tunney Bridge, Los Angeles, CA (2015)
- Art Center College of Design Master Plan, Pasadena, CA (2015)
- Star Apartments, Los Angeles, CA (2014)
- Playa Vista Park, Playa Vista, CA (2010)
- Pittman Dowell Residence, La Crescenta, CA (2009)
- New Carver Apartments, Los Angeles, CA (2009)
- Inner-City Arts, Los Angeles, CA (1995, 2005, 2008)
- Rainbow Apartments, Los Angeles, CA (2005)
- BookBar, Jinhua Architecture Park, Jinhua, China (2006)
- Billy Wilder Theater, Los Angeles, CA (2006)
- MOMA QNS, Long Island City, NY (2002)
- Hergott Shepard Residence, Beverly Hills, CA (1998)
- Los Angeles Sixth Street Viaduct (2022) [11]

=== Gallery ===
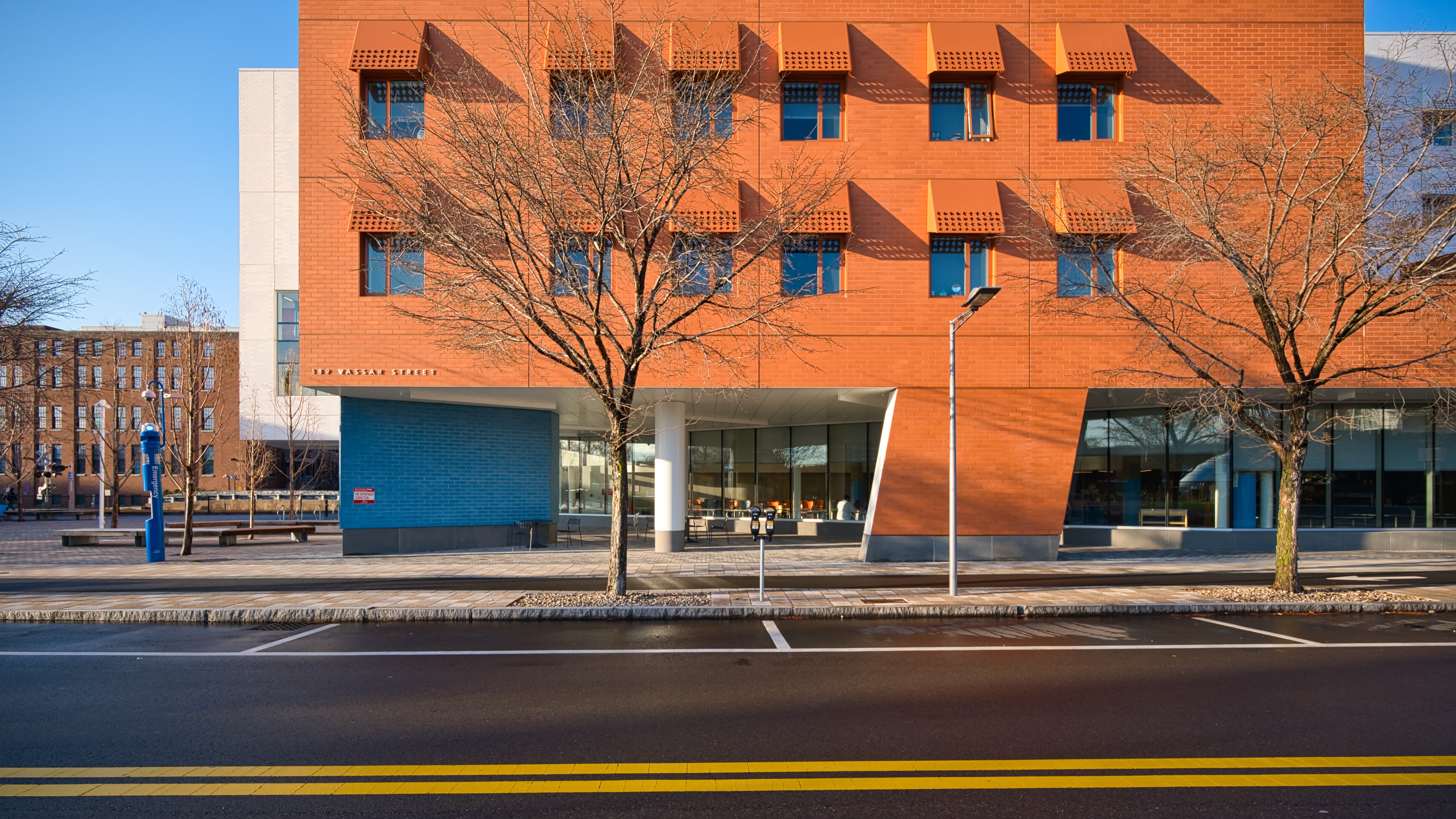
New Vassar, MIT, Cambridge, MA

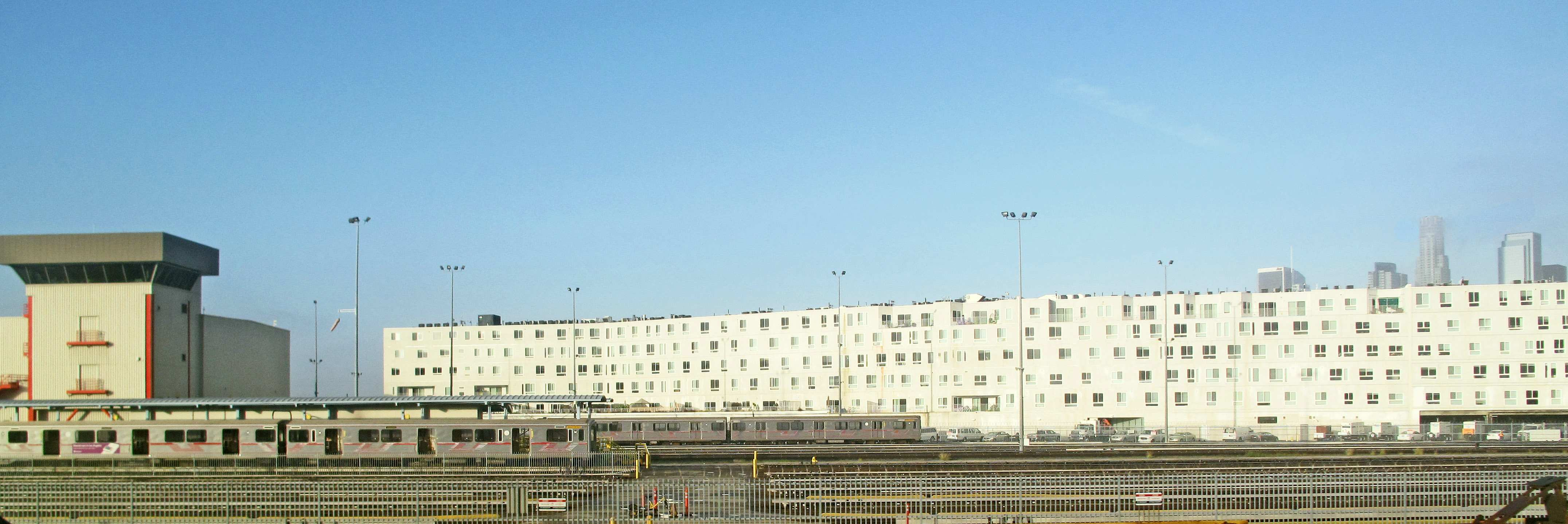
One Santa Fe, Los Angeles, CA

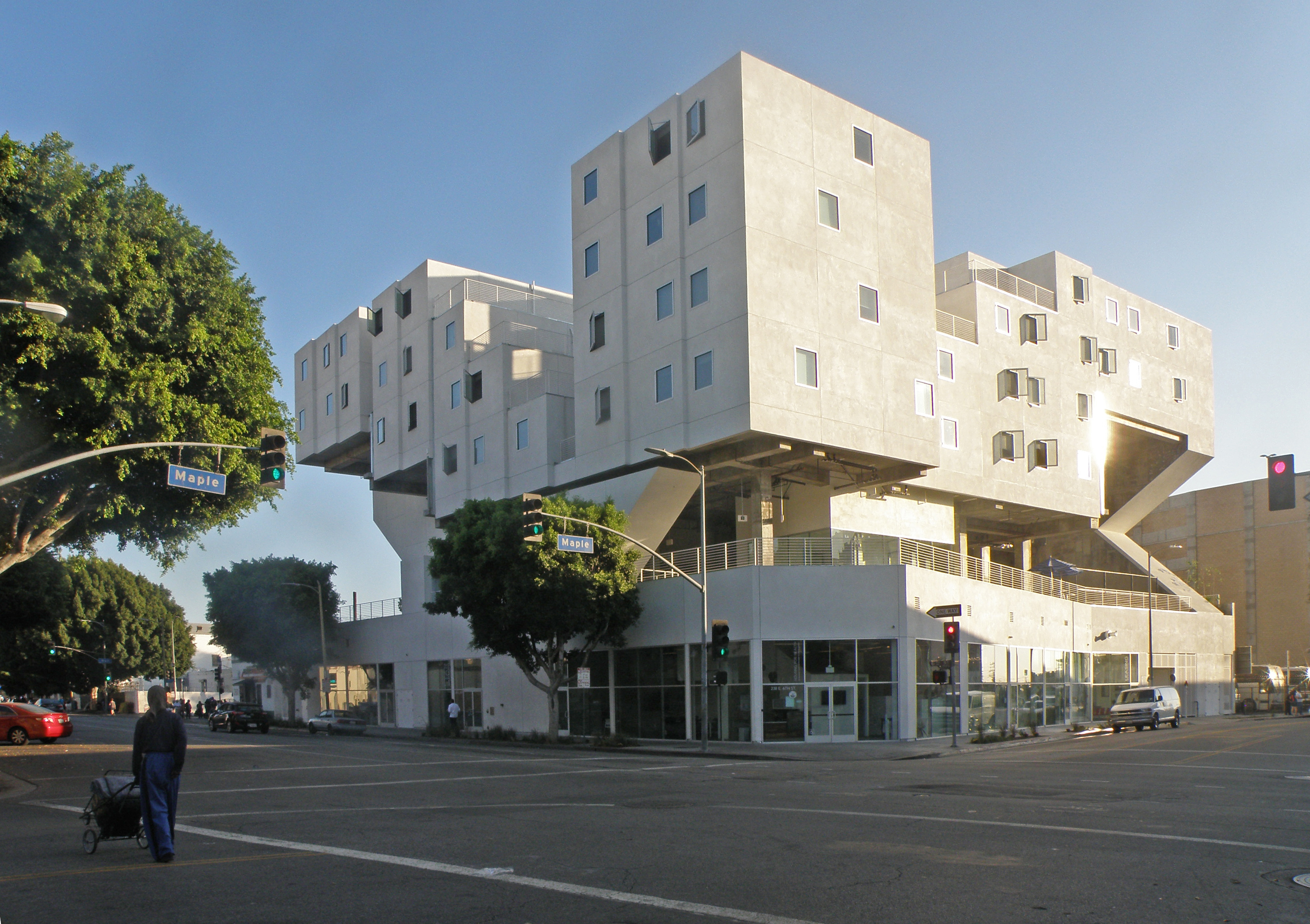
Star Apartments, Los Angeles, CA

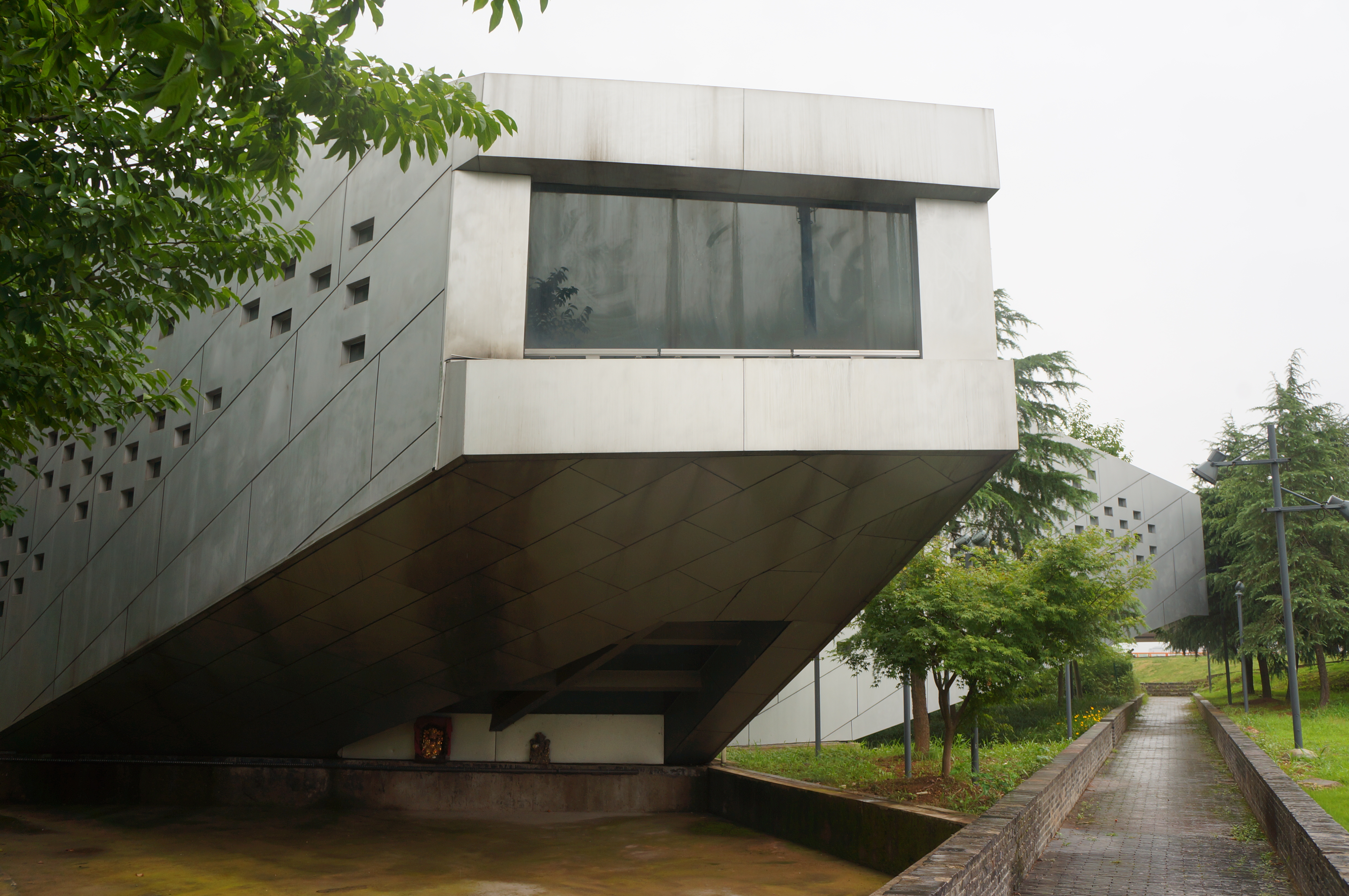
BookBar, Jinhua Architecture Park

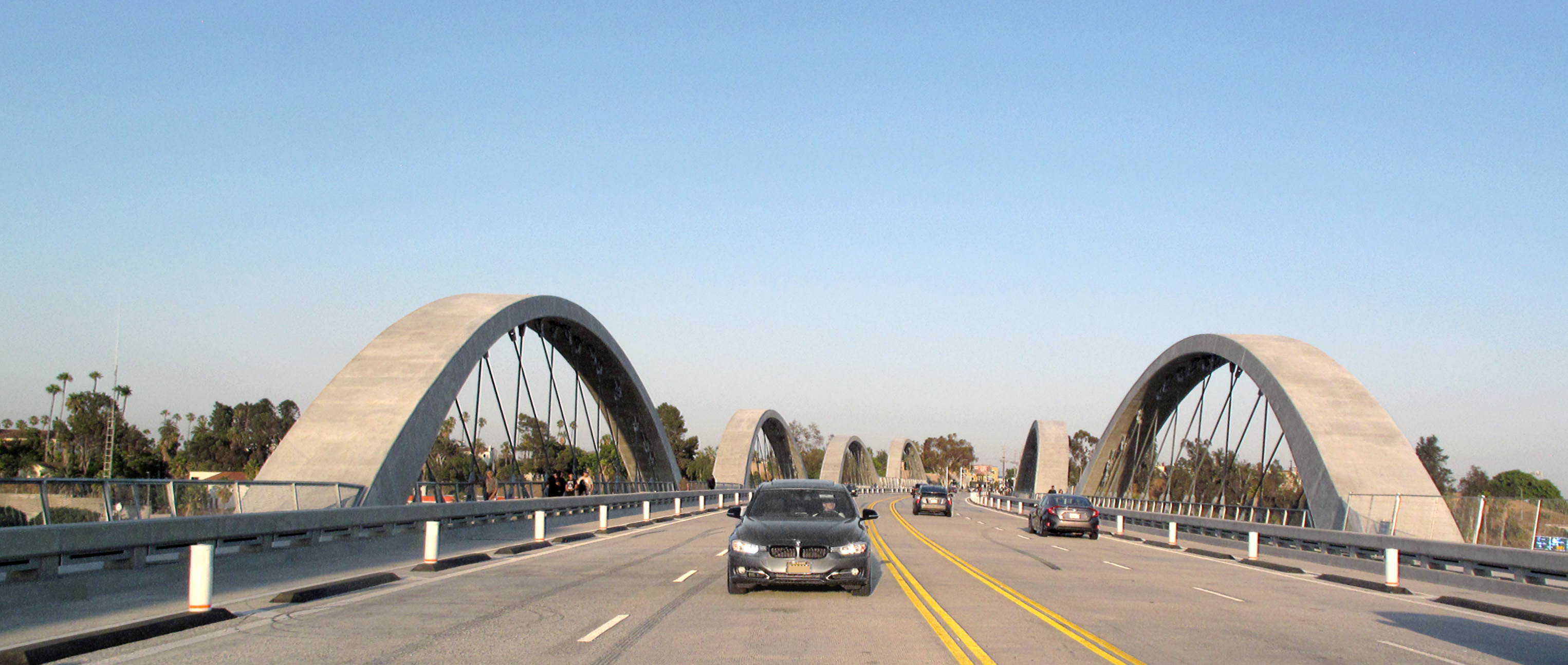
Sixth Street Viaduct, Los Angeles, CA

== Personal life ==
Maltzan has been married to fellow architect Amy Murphy since 1988.

== Major publications ==
- Social Transparency: Projects On Housing / Columbia Books on Architecture and the City, 2016; ISBN 978-1-941332-19-1
- Other Space Odysseys: Greg Lynn, Michael Maltzan, Alessandro Poli / edited by Giovanna Borasi, Mirko Zardini (2010, Canadian Centre for Architecture; ISBN 978-0-920785-88-1)
