= Tomás Bilbao Hospitalet =

Spanish politician and architect (1890–1954)

Acting Minister of Justice
- In office 14 September 1938 – 27 September 1938

Minister without portfolio
- In office 16 August 1938 – 5 March 1939

Personal details
- Born: 18 September 1890 Bilbao, Spain
- Died: 16 March 1954 (aged 63) Mexico City, Mexico
- Spouse: Julia Durán
- Children: 7
- Education: Madrid School of Architecture

Tomás Bilbao Hospitalet (1890–1954) was a Spanish architect and politician. He was among the founders of Basque Nationalist Action. During the Spanish Civil War, he served as minister withour portfolio and acting minister of justice. He exiled first to France and then, to Mexico.

== Early life and education ==
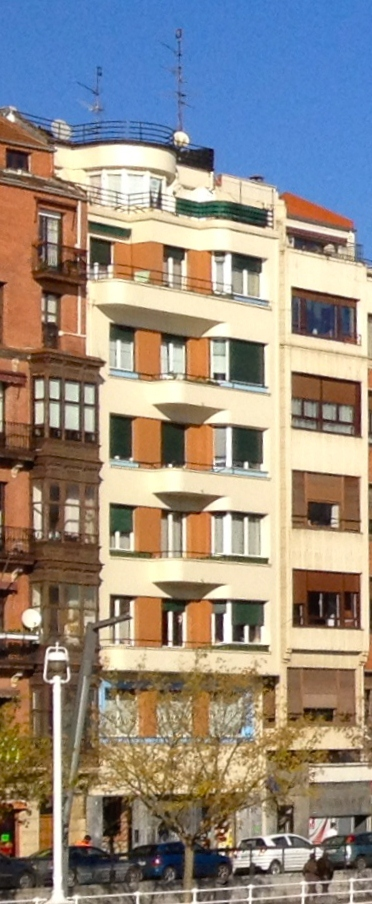
Erripa Kalea, a building designed by Tomás Bilbao in Bilbao

Bilbao was born in Bilbao on 18 September 1890 and his father was a building contractor. He received a degree in architecture in 1918 from the School of Architecture of Madrid.

== Career ==
After working as an architect Bilbao designed Altos Hornos de Vizcaya in 1929. Like other architects of his generation he was influenced from German expressionism and the architectural approach led by Erich Mendelsohn. Bilbao was involved in politics becoming a cofounder of the Basque Nationalist Action party in 1930 and the president of the Bilbao Municipal Housing Board in 1931. He was also councillor and deputy mayor of the Bilbao City Council during the Second Republic. In the period 1938–1939 he was minister without portfolio.

== Exile, personal life and death ==
After the Civil War Bilbao first exiled to France. Then he settled in Mexico in May 1942 when France was invaded by the Nazi forces. There he worked for the Compañía Mexicana de Comercio Exterior.

Bilbao was married to Julia Durán with whom he had seven children. Their oldest son was arrested and executed following the exile of his father. Tomás Bilbao died in Mexico City on 16 March 1954.

One of his grandchildren, Tatiana Bilbao, is a well-known architect in Mexico.
