= Swiss Architecture Museum =

Coordinates: 47°33′13″N 7°35′27″E

Swiss Architecture Museum (S AM)
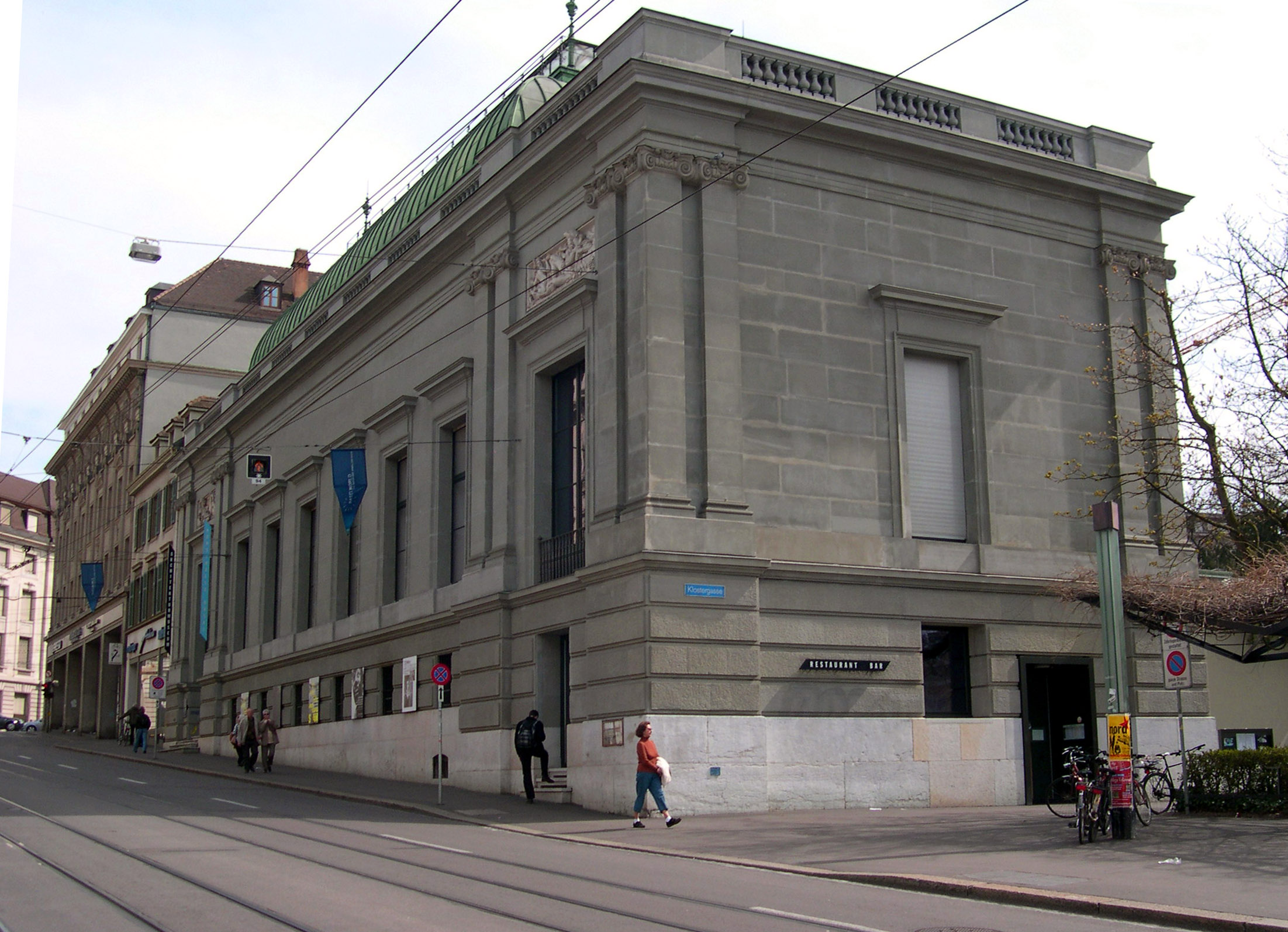
- Former name: Architekturmuseum AM
- Established: 1984
- Location: Basel, Switzerland
- Type: Architecture museum
- Visitors: 34,424 (2018)
- Director: Andreas Ruby
- Architect: Peter Märkli (interiors)
- Website: www.sam-basel.org

The S AM Swiss Architecture Museum (German: S AM Schweizerisches Architekturmuseum) is an architecture museum in Basel, Switzerland. Through its program of temporary exhibitions and events, it contributes to international debates on architecture and urban development as well as related socio-political aspects. In addition, the museum issues publications and holds special events in conjunction with the exhibitions. Its premises are located within the Kunsthalle Basel.

== Exhibitions ==
Since its foundation, the museum has realised over 170 exhibitions. Events in the form of lectures, discussions, talks, workshops, guided tours, and numerous publications accompany the exhibitions.

- 2022 Napoli Super Modern
- 2021 Beton
- 2021 Mock-up
- 2020 Basel 2050
- 2019 Under the Radar
- 2019 Swim City
- 2018 Dichtelust – Forms of Urban Coexistence in Switzerland
- 2017 Bengal Stream
- 2017 Schweizweit
- 2015 Bernhard Tschumi
- 2014 Young Swiss Architects
- 2012 City Inc.
- 2011 The Object of Zionism
- 2010 Richard Neutra
- 2009 Madelon Vriesendorp
- 2008 Balkanology
- 2005 Zaha Hadid
- 2000 Peter Märkli
- 1997 New Building in the Alps
- 1993 Rafael Moneo
- 1992 Livio Vacchini
- 1989 Frank O. Gehry
- 1988 Herzog & de Meuron
- 1988 Office for Metropolitan Architecture
- 1987 Le Corbusier and Raoul La Roche
- 1984 Jean Prouvé

== See also ==
- Architecture museums
- Museums in Basel
- List of museums in Switzerland
