= Tatiana Bilbao =

Mexican architect (born 1972)

Tatiana Bilbao Spamer
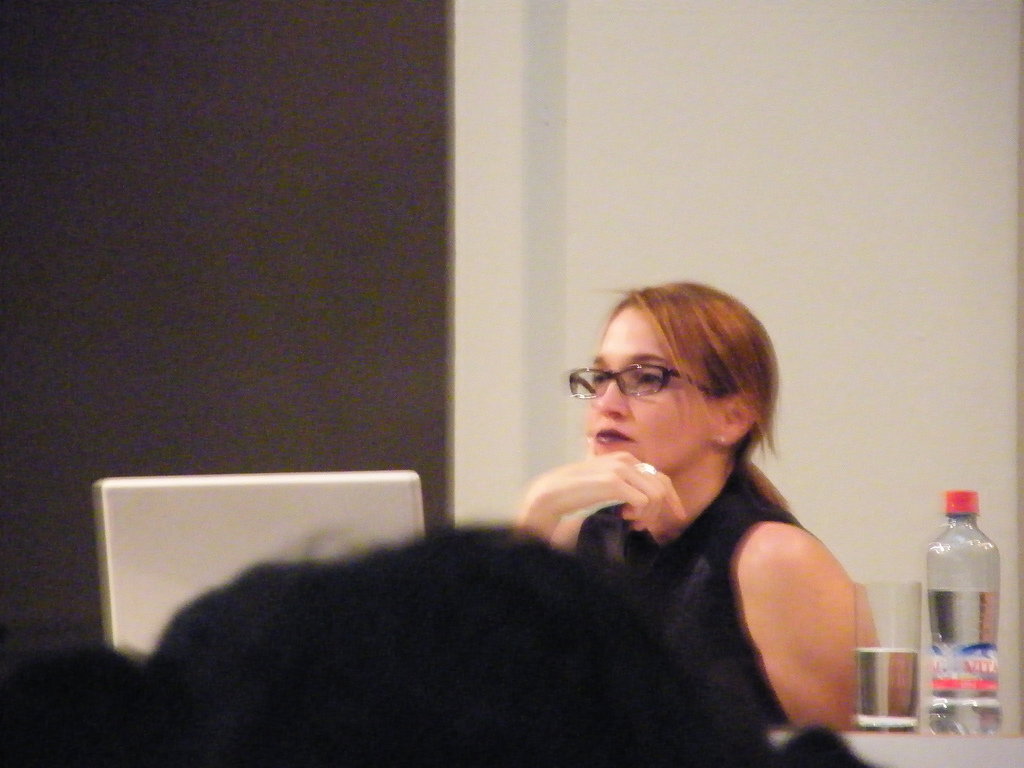
- Born: 1972 (age 53–54); Mexico City, Mexico
- Education: Universidad Iberoamericana
- Awards: 2009 Architectural League Emerging Voices; 2010 Built Work of the Year, CEMEX; 2011 Young Architect, Colegio de Arquitectos CAM-SAM; 2012 Berliner Kunstpreis, Akademie der Künste; 2014 Global Award for Sustainable Architecture Prize; 2017 A+Awards Impact Award; 2019 Marcus Prize

Tatiana Bilbao Spamer (born 1972) is a Mexican architect whose works often merged geometry with nature. Her practice focuses on sustainable design, museum design and social housing.

She founded Tatiana Bilbao ESTUDIO in 2004 and has completed projects in China, France, the United States, Mexico, Guatemala, among others. Representative projects include the Botanical Garden of Culiacán, Sinaloa, the exhibition hall of a park located in Jinhua, China and a prototype of sustainable social housing of 62 m^{2} (670 sq ft) with the capacity to duplicate with a cost of 120 thousand Mexican pesos, that was presented at the Chicago Architecture Biennial in 2015, and originally screened in Chiapas, Mexico.

Bilbao's work has been recognized with the Berliner Kunstpreis in 2012, the 2010 Architectural League Emerging Voices, the Global Award for Sustainable Architecture by the LOCUS Foundation in 2014, and the Impact Award 2017 to the Architizer A+Awards Honorees, along with the 2020 Tau Sigma Delta Gold Medal and the 2019 Marcus Prize Award.

== Biography ==
Tatiana Bilbao was born in Mexico City into a family of architects. Her grandfather was Tomás Bilbao Hospitalet, a Basque-origin architect and politician who fled Spain and settled in Mexico in 1942.

She studied architecture at the Universidad Iberoamericana where she obtained her Bachelor of Architecture and Urbanism degree in 1996. In 1998, Bilbao received an honorable mention and was awarded the best architecture thesis of the year. Bilbao focused on sustainable design and social housing in her book "A House is Not Just a House". In this book she said, "We can't forget that housing is a human right. Houses are not just for sale. Houses are for people, and we have to think of them first."

=== Early life ===
Bilbao's work was influenced by her political interest in Mexico City. In 1985 the government was faced with a great need for housing after a major earthquake. This caused the government to make mass-produced housing with over 2.5 million houses being built in the course of six years. Bilbao hated seeing developers take land and the identity of Mexico. So Bilbao met with architects and Infonavit, the federally owned bank that grants massive housing loans, to start reconvening new city centers and creating satellite urban environments. As Bilbao became more influential different configurations of houses were designed with high resale value. Bilbao then started designing housing for under 8k for the lower-class which led to her focus on social housing.

In 1998–99, Bilbao worked as an advisor for Urban Projects at the Urban Housing and Development Department of Mexico City. During that time, she also worked as advisor of the Secretaría de Desarrollo Urbano y Vivienda del Gobierno del Distrito Federal, a government agency that oversees urban development and housing in Mexico City. Bilbao co-founded LCM in 1999 which explores uncharted geometries and generates unprecedented spaces.

In 2004, Bilbao founded MX.DF along with architects Derek Dellekamp, Arturo Ortiz, and Michel Rojkind. MX.DF is an urban research center, attending the production of space, its occupation, defense, and control in Mexico City. Also in 2004, she founded Tatiana Bilbao Estudio, to work on projects in China, Europe and Mexico. The first project built by her studio was the exhibition pavilion in Jinhua Architecture Park, led and coordinated by Chinese artist Ai Weiwei who selected a group of young architects from around the world to design and develop a large park with a network of pavilions on the shore of the Yiwu River, close to Shanghai. The exhibition pavilion of Jinhua Architecture Park is one of Bilbao's more famous works. Completed in 2007, this embedded pavilion features multiple levels and strategic blocking.

Her diverse work includes the Botanical Garden in Culiacán, a master plan and open chapel for a Pilgrimage Route in Jalisco, a Biotechnological Center for a Tech Institution, a sustainable housing prototype, and a funeral home. Bilbao has worked to create low-cost housing to solve Mexico's social housing problem. So far, Bilbao has built 32 houses for this program which helps low-income individuals afford their own home.

=== Recent years ===
In 2005, she joined the Architecture and Urbanism career at the Universidad Iberoamericana as a Design professor. In 2008, she was appointed visiting professor at the Andrés Bello University, in Santiago de Chile. Bilbao has been visiting professor at Andres Bello University, Yale School of Architecture, Peter Behrens School of Architecture, and the Rice School of Architecture. Bilbao taught at Columbia University's Graduate School of Architecture, Planning, and Preservation and was a professor of design at her alma mater, Ibero-American University.

In 2017 Bilbao curated, in collaboration with Gonzalo Ortega, the exhibition Perspectives: Tatiana Bilbao Estudio organized by the Museum of Contemporary Art (MARCO) in the city of Monterrey, Nuevo León, where their projects produced in the period from 2004 to 2017 were presented. This sample was also presented at the Amparo Museum in Puebla a year later.

In 2019, the Louisiana Museum in Denmark presented a homonymous exhibition about Bilbao's work within the series "The Architect's Studio", this exhibition belongs to the second edition where internationally renowned architects have participated showing their architectural career. In this exhibition, you can see how Mexican culture and traditions play an essential role in her work as well as her commitment to social and sustainable architecture. Likewise, there is a collaboration with the National Museum of Art of Mexico City, MUNAL, and works by artists such as José María Velasco and Dr. Atl will be presented.

== Awards ==
Bilbao was the recipient of the Design Vanguard "Top 10 Emerging Firm" award in 2007. In 2010, Bilbao was named as part of the Architectural League Emerging Voices. She received the Kunstpries Berlin award in 2012 and in 2013, she was awarded the CEMEX Building award. In 2014, Bilbao received the Global Award for Sustainable Architecture Prize from the LOCUS Foundation and the Cite de L'Architecture of Paris. This award is presented annually to five architects who have shown unique approaches to sustainable development in response to the needs of society. In 2017, Bilbao received the A+Awards Impact Award for her groundbreaking work in social housing and sustainable design. In 2019, Bilbao received the Marcus Prize. In the same year, she was presented with the Leading Ladies of Entertainment accolade by the Latin Recording Academy.

Tatiana Bilbao's projects are part of the collection of the Centre d'Art George Pompidou in Paris, France, the Carnegie Museum of Art, and the Art Institute of Chicago.

== Projects ==
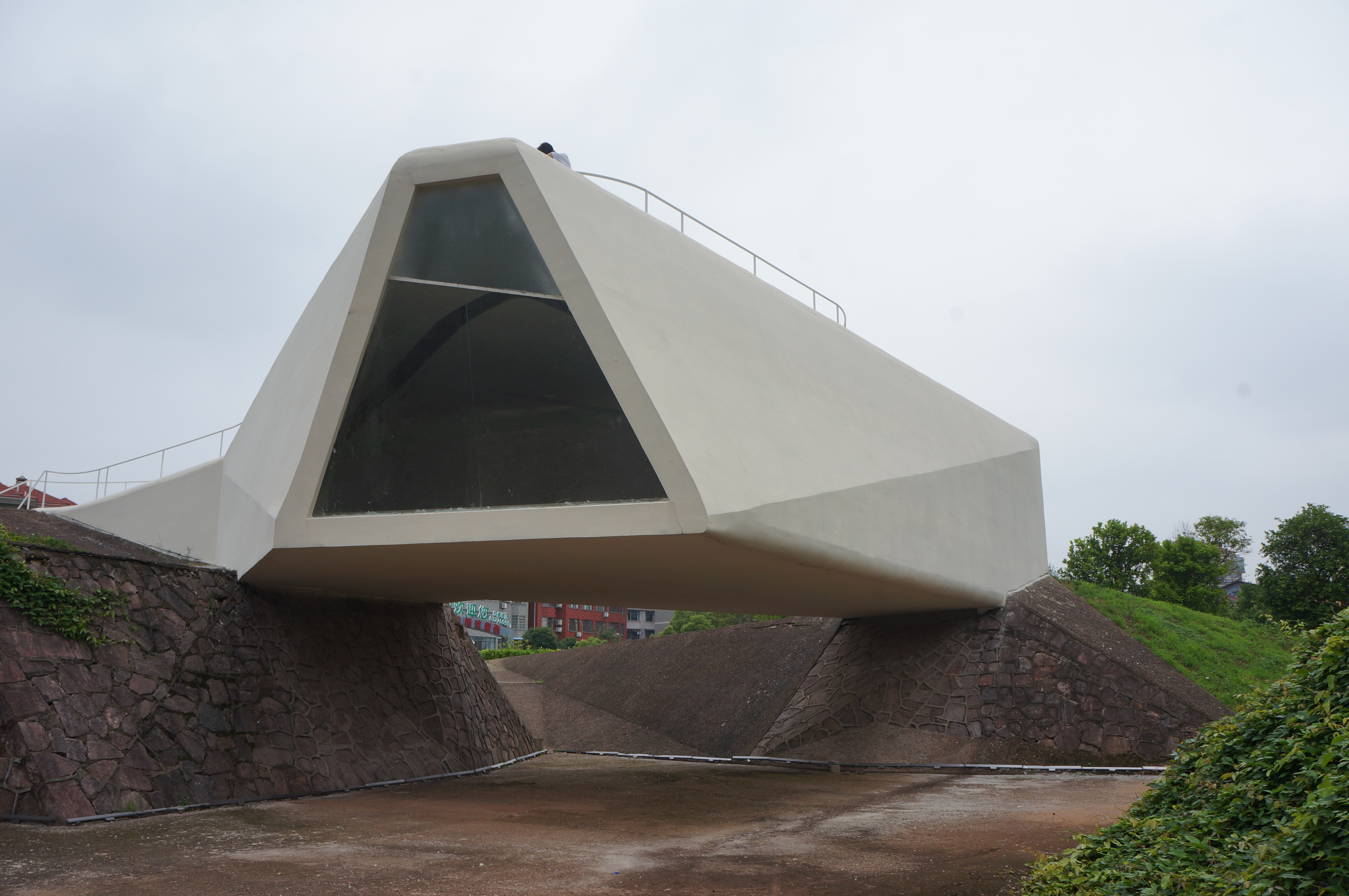
"Exhibition Room" designed by Bilbao at Jinhua Architecture Park.

- Mazatlán Aquarium, 2017–2021 (expected completion)
- Anahuacalli Museum Extension, Mexico City, Mexico, 2016. 2,295.0 m square.
- Los Terrenos, San Pedro Garza Garcia, Mexico, 480 sqm, 2016.
- Observatory House, La Blanca, Mexico, 2009.
- Ordos House 100, Ordos, Inner-Mongolia, China, 1’388 sqm, project, 2008–2010 (2008–2010)
- Exhibition Room in Jinhua Architecture Park, Zheijiang, China, 1’800 sqm, 2004–2006
- Apartment Building, Polanco, Mexico, 2005
- Pilgrim's Route, Between Ameca and Talpa de Allende, Mexico, 2008 – 2010
- Casa Ventura, San Pedro Garza Garcia, Nuevo León, Mexico, 2008 – 2011
- Bioinnova, Culiacan, Sinaloa, Mexico, 2008 – 2012
- Ajijic House, Chapala Lake, Jalisco, Mexico, 2010 – 2011
- Monarch Sustainable Neighbourhood Angangueo, Angangueo, Michoacan, Mexico, 2010 – 2013
- Los Terrenos, Monterrey, Nuevo León, Mexico, 2012 – 2016
- Housing +, San Cristobal, Chiapas and Acuna, Coahuila, Mexico, 2013 – 2015
- Lyon La Confluence, Ilot A3, La Confluence, Lyon France, 2013 – 2017
- Territorio De Gigantes, Aguascalientes, Mexico, 2013 – 2018
- Sorteo Tec House, San Pedro Garza, Monterrey, New Mexico, 2014 – 2016
- Solo House, Solo, Spain, 2014 – 2016
- Casa Del Parque, Guadalajara, Jalisco, Mexico, 2014 – 2018
- Central Park Mazatlan, Mazatlan, Sinaloa, Mexico, 2015 – 2018
- Guatemala Tower, Guatemala, Guatemala, 2015 – 2018
- Hunter's Point Masterplan, San Francisco, California, USA, 2016
- Estoa – UDEM, Monterrey, Mexico, 2016 – 2019
- Anahuacalli, Museo Anahuacalli, Coyoacan, City of Mexico, Mexico, 2017
- (Not) Another – Tower Chicago Architecture Biennial, Chicago Cultural Center, Chicago, USA, 2017 -2018
- Apan Housing: Ocoyoacac Minimum Housing, Apan, Hidalgo, Mexico, 2017 – 2018
- Casa Marbel and Casa Pedro y Paz, Estado de Mexico, Mexico, 2018 – 2019
- Ways of Life, Sheid, Hasse, Germany, In Process
- Urban Redensification – Apodoca, Apodoca, Nuevo León, Mexico, In Process
- Collegium, Arevalo, Avila, Spain, In Process
- Research Center of the Sea of Cortes, Mazatlan, Sinaloa, Mexico, In Process
- Substation, San Francisco, California, USA, In Process
- Staterra, Los Cabos, Baja California Sur, Mexico, In Process
- Olive West Masterplan, St. Louis, Missouri, USA, In Process
- Silica II – Roble 700, San Pedro Garcia, Mexico, In Process

== Investigation and another works ==
- Research project as a fellow of the Graham Foundation, Twelve Archaeologies of Mexico City's Housing at a Crossroads, 2016 – 2019
- Museography for the Exhibition The Rights of Dance: Alexander Calder, Museo Jumex, Mexico City, March – June 2015
- Museography for the Exhibition The Implications of the Image, Puebla Gallery, Puebla, Mexico, October 2009 – January 2010
- Museography for the Mexico Expected / Unexpected Exhibition in Maision Rouge, Paris, France, October 2008 – February 2010
- Museography for the YAG Exhibition at La Planta, Guadalajara, Jalisco, November 2007 – March 20* 08
- Participation in Stonemasonry in Context, workshop conducted by MIT, Cambridge University and ESTAM, B. Mallorca, Summer 2009

== Bibliography ==
- Chipperfield, David. 2020. “La Buona Pratica = Good Practice : Tatiana Bilbao.” Domus, no. 1047 (June): 20–27.
- Bilbao, Tatiana, Nile Greenberg, Ayesha S Ghosh, and Iwan Baan. Two Sides of the Border : Reimagining the Region (2020). Print.
- Britannica Academic, s.v. "Tatiana Bilbao," accessed March 30, 2021, https://academic-eb-com.lib-e2.lib.ttu.edu/levels/collegiate/article/Tatiana-Bilbao/626434.
- Bilbao, Tatiana. A House Is Not Just a House: Projects on Housing. Columbia Books on Architecture and the city, 2018.
- Bilbao, Tatiana. Tatiana Bilbao Estudio. Perspectives. Arquine, 2018.
- Jodidio, Philip. Casa Moderna: Latin American Living. Thames & Hudson Ltd, 2018.
- “Goldsmith Interviews: Tatiana Bilbao.” Informal-Brandmark-Inverse, soa.utexas.edu/headlines/goldsmith-interviews-tatiana-bilbao.
