= Haitian Health Foundation =

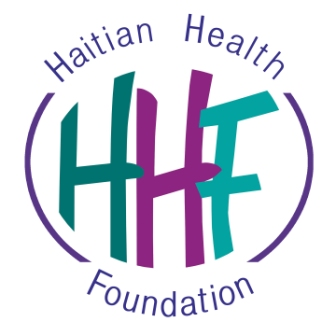
HHF Logo

The Haitian Health Foundation (a.k.a. HHF) is a U.S. 501(c)(3) nonprofit organization that provides relief services to residents of rural southwest Haiti. It has four major areas of focus: health care, development, relief, and education. The official website is: www.HaitianHealthFoundation.org

The mission of the Haitian Health Foundation is to improve the health and well-being of women, children, families and communities in Haiti through healthcare, education and community development.

HHF is supported by contributions from private foundations, individual donors, USAID, and in-kind donations. Headquartered in Norwich, Connecticut, HHF's current president is Jeremiah J. Lowney, DDS, MS, MPH, KM, who also founded the organization. Its current executive director is E. Marilyn Lowney, MS, MPH, and its current Country Director is Nadesha Mijoba, MS-CED, MPH.

== History and background ==
HHF began in 1982 with a trip to Port-au-Prince by Dr. Jeremiah J. Lowney, a Connecticut orthodontist, who traveled to Haiti to provide free dental care to the poor.

He would travel down every three months, to work with Mother Teresa's Sisters of Charity, Mother Teresa. In 1985, Mother Teresa requested that Dr. Lowney move his small group's outreach to the rural city of Jérémie. This volunteer effort developed into outpatient health care, an extensive public health outreach to mountain villages, house and toilet construction for the poorest villagers, nutritional rehabilitation, educational support for youth, animal distribution, and other programs.

== Geographic areas served ==
HHF provides services to the rural poor within the city of Jérémie (population: 97,000) and to over 100 rural and mountain villages in the Grand'Anse, Haiti.

== Humanitarian services ==
=== Health Care ===
HHF operates an outpatient clinic, an extensive public health outreach programs to over 100 rural and mountain villages, and a residential facility for women in high-risk pregnancies and children with Kwashiorkor malnutrition (Center of Hope). HHF has also facilitated specialized surgeries (e.g., cleft lip) performed in Jérémie as well as other areas of Haiti. Children have also been brought to the US for specialized surgeries not available in Haiti.

HHF's maternal health program was featured on the PBS "NOW" program on January 29, 2010, in a story entitled "Saving Haiti's Mothers" (which was filmed in Haiti at the time of the January 12, 2010, earthquake).

=== Development ===
==== Housing ====
Under its Happy House program—started in 1997—HHF provides housing for homeless and poor families residing in rickety hovels.

==== Animal distribution ====
HHF has distributed thousands of animals to impoverished farming families, helping to provide some self-sufficiency. Thousands of Kreyol pigs and chickens have propagated as a result. Currently, HHF distributes female breeding goats with its Give a Goat program.

==== Sanitation ====
In 1993 HHF began constructing pit toilets under its Clean Latrine project, which encourages sanitation and helps to curtail the spread of disease related to lack of proper waste disposal. In 2016, HHF began constructing composting toilets.

=== Relief ===
==== Save-a-Family ====
HHF's Save a Family program began in 1987. The program, run by volunteers, links sponsors in the US, Europe, and Canada with some of the poorest families in Jérémie. The funding provides for food, rent, education for children, and other family needs.

==== Feeding programs ====
Haitian Health Foundation operates an active food program, that provides hot meals and take-home food to the most vulnerable in Jérémie and the rural mountains, including children, perinatal women, the elderly, and the ill.

=== Education ===
Separate from the Save-a-Family program, thousands of other children have been provided with elementary and secondary assistance through HHF's education-based programs.

== Awards and recognitions ==
=== Independent Charities of America Seal of Excellence ===
The Independent Charities Seal of Excellence is awarded to the members of Independent Charities of America that have, "upon rigorous independent review, been able to certify, document, and demonstrate on an annual basis that they meet the highest standards of public accountability, program effectiveness, and cost effectiveness."
