= American Architecture Awards =

Architecture award

The Chicago Athenaeum Museum logo

The American Architecture Awards is a national and international awards program for new architecture, landscape architecture, interiors, and urban planning in the United States. The program was launched by the Chicago Athenaeum Museum of Architecture and Design in 1994 to honor the most outstanding architecture designed across the world. The Awards Program is open to all American architecture offices and international firms with projects inside the United States from the past two years. The awards are organized annually with The European Center for Architecture Art Design and Urban Studies.

The Awards are the nation's highest public recognition for architectural design excellence given by a non-commercial, non-trade affiliated public arts, culture and educational institution in the United States. The awards deadline is February 1 and the awards are given annually at the end of September by the Chicago Athenaeum Museum of Architecture and Design and Metropolitan Arts Press Ltd. The winning projects are selected by a jury from several hundred submissions from architectural practices in the U.S. and around the world.

Recent juries for awards have been conducted in Dublin, Ireland (2007) Athens, Greece (2008); Stuttgart, Germany (2009); Istanbul, Turkey (2010); Vancouver, Canada (2011); Seoul, South Korea (2013); Athens, Greece (2014); Phoenix Arizona (2015); and Denver, Colorado (2016) in coordination with The Royal Institute of the Architects of Ireland, The Turkish Camber of Architects in Istanbul, The Frank Lloyd Wright School of Architecture, The Royal Architectural Institute of Canada in Vancouver, The Federation of Institutes of Korean Architects, The Hellenic Institute of Architecture, International Biennial of Architecture Buenos Aires, The Istanbul Design Biennial, and The University of Florence.

The Awards are published each year in Global Design + Urbanism by Metropolitan Arts Press.

The awarded projects form an exhibition, "The City and the World", that has toured inside the United States and Europe.

== Awarded projects ==
The number of awarded projects:

1. 1994 – 30 projects
2. 1995 – 29 projects
3. 1996 – 40 projects
4. 1997 – 27 projects
5. 1998 – 29 projects
6. 1999 – 32 projects
7. 2000–43 projects
8. 2001–31 projects
9. 2002–35 projects
10. 2003–42 projects
11. 2004–37 projects
12. 2005–29 projects
13. 2006–33 projects
14. 2007–32 projects
15. 2008–65 projects
16. 2009–64 projects
17. 2010–47 projects
18. 2011–45 projects
19. 2012–62 projects
20. 2013–65 projects
21. 2014–65 projects
22. 2015–60 projects
23. 2016–74 projects
24. 2017-79 projects
25. 2018-113 projects
26. 2019-105 projects
27. 2020 -128 projects
28. 2021 - 120 projects
