= Suzanne Hall (ethnographer) =

British ethnographer

- Awards: Philip Leverhulme Prize Rome Scholarship in Architecture

Academic background
- Education: London School of Economics and Political Science (PhD)
- Thesis: A mile of mixed blessings: an ethnography of boundaries and belonging on a South London street (2010)
- Doctoral advisor: Janet Foster, Robert Tavernor

Academic work
- Discipline: sociology
- Sub-discipline: ethnography
- Institutions: London School of Economics and Political Science
- Main interests: urban ethnography
- Notable works: City Street and Citizen The Migrant’s Paradox

Suzanne Hall is Professor in the Department of Sociology at the London School of Economics and Political Science, where she directed the Cities Programme. Her work explores intersections of global migration and urban marginalisation. Hall formerly practised as an architect in South Africa focusing on public projects for the first democratically elected state. She has been recognised for her work in both fields, receiving the Philip Leverhulme Prize in Sociology in 2017, and the Rome Scholarship in Architecture Prize in 1998. Hall was born in Johannesburg, South Africa, in 1969.

== Key Studies ==
Hall’s work focuses on everyday claims to space and how political economies of displacement shape racial borders, migrant livelihoods, and urban multiculture. Between 2011 and 2021 she undertook several studies of migrant street economies across the UK and in Cape Town, in research collaborations on Ordinary Streets, Super-diverse Streets, and Beyond Banglatown (led by Claire Alexander) and Migrant Margins. Hall describes ‘edge economies’ as ‘located in the expanding terrain of redundancies and casualised employment; they surface where the effects are most likely to be located, and they reveal who is most likely to be affected.’

Hall co-founded the Race, Space and Architecture open access curriculum in 2020 with Huda Tayob and Thandi Loewenson. In 2022, Hall was selected to give the inaugural ‘Cities Annual Lecture’ at Birkbeck University.

== Publications ==
- (2022) Apportioned City, Environment and Planning D (with Henrietta Nyamnjoh and Liza Rose Cirolia)
- (2022) Suspension: Disabling the city of refuge? Journal of Ethnic and Migration Studies (with Myria Georgiou and Deena Dajani)
- (2022) Edge Syntax: Vocabularies for violent times, Duke University Press
- (2021) The Migrant’s Paradox: Street Livelihoods and marginal citizenship in Britain, University of Minnesota Press
- (2019) Race, Space and Architecture (with Huda Tayob)
- (2017) Migrant Infrastructure, Urban Studies (with Julia King and Robin Finlay)
- (2017) The Sage Handbook of the 21st Century City, Sage (co-edited with Ricky Burdett)
- (2012) City, Street and Citizen: The Measure of the ordinary, Routledge
