= List of compositions by Betsy Jolas =

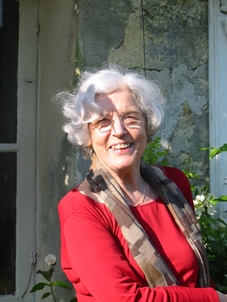
Betsy Jolas in 2006

This is a list of compositions by Betsy Jolas (born 1926). Her music is published by Éditions Alphonse Leduc, Éditions Billaudot and Éditions Salabert, amongst others.

== Opera and stage works ==
- Le Pavillon au Bord de la Rivière (1975), chamber opera in 4 acts
- Schliemann (1982–83), opera in 3 acts
- Le Cyclope (1986), chamber opera in 1 act
- Ajax (1960), incidental music for the play by Sophocles
- Les troyennes (1961), incidental music for the play by Euripides
- La dernière existence au camp de Tatenberg, incidental music for the play by Armand Gatti

== Orchestra ==
- D'un opéra de voyage (1967) for chamber orchestra
- Quatre Plages (1967) for string orchestra
- Well Met (1973) for string orchestra
- Tales of a summer sea (1977) for orchestra
- Cinq pièces pour Boulogne (1982) (2 versions)
- Just a Minute! (1986)
- Well Met 04 – Pantomime for 12 strings (2004)
- B Day (2006) for symphony orchestra
- A Little Summer Suite (2015)
- Well Met Suite (2016)
- Latest (2021) for large orchestra

== Solo works with orchestra or ensemble ==
- Points D'Aube (1968) for viola and ensemble
- Musique d'hiver (1971) for organ and small orchestra
- États (1967) for violin and 6 percussionists
- Trois Rencontres (1973) for solo string trio and symphony orchestra
- How-Now (1973) for 8 instruments
- Onze Lieder (1977) for trumpet and chamber orchestra
- Stances (1978) for piano and orchestra
- Points d'or (1982) for saxophonist (playing soprano, alto, tenor, baritone) and 15 instruments
- Frauenleben (1992) for viola and orchestra
- Lumor, 7 Lieder spirituels for a saxophonist (playing soprano and tenor) and orchestra (1996)
- Petite symphonie concertante (1997) for conducting violin and orchestra
- Wanderlied (2003) for cello and 15 instruments
- Histoires Vraies (2015) for trumpet and orchestra
- Side Roads (2017) for cello and strings

== Works for large ensemble ==
- Figures (1965) for 9 instruments
- J.D.E. (1966) for 14 musicians
- D'un opéra de poupée en sept musiques (1982) for 11 instruments
- Préludes, Fanfares, Interludes, Sonneries (1983) for wind band
- Sonate à 8 (1998) for cello octet

== Chamber music ==
- Sonate à Trois (1956) for recorder, viola da gamba and harpsichord
- Quartet No. 1 (1956)
- Quartet No. 3, 9 études for string quartet (1973)
- O Wall (1976) for wind quintet
- Trio (1988) for piano trio
- Quartet No. 4 – Menus Propos (1989) for string quartet
- Trio "Les Heures" (1991) for string trio
- Musique pour Xavier (1993) for clarinet, tenor saxophone and violin
- Quartet No. 5 (1994) for string quartet
- Music for here (1994) for solo bassoon with accompaniment of viola and cello
- Quartet No. 6 (1997) for clarinet and string trio
- Petite sonnerie de juin (1997) for horn, trumpet and trombone
- Trio sopra et sola facta (1999–2000) for violin, clarinet and piano
- Titivillus (2000) for mezzo-soprano, flute and piano or 2 flutes and piano
- Ah! Haydn (2007) for piano trio
- Quatuor VII (Afterthoughts) (2018) for trumpet, violin, viola and cello

== Duos ==
- Trifolium (1947) for flute and piano
- Remember (1971) for cor anglais (or viola) and cello
- Four Duos (1978) for viola and piano
- Trois études campanaires (1980) for carillon and keyboard
- Quatre pièces en marge (1983) for cello and piano
- Three Duos (1983) for tuba and piano
- Music for Joan (1988) for vibraphone and piano
- Petites musiques de chevet (1989) for bass clarinet and piano, (2022) for cello and piano
- E.A petite suite variée (1991) for trumpet in C and vibraphone
- Études aperçues (1992) for vibraphone and 5 cow bells
- Musique pour Delphine (1992) for violin and cello
- Quoth the raven, 3 pieces for clarinet and piano (1993)
- Frauenleben (1994) for viola and piano
- Music to go (1995) for viola and cello
- Come follow (2001) for bassoon and viola
- Lovemusic (2005) for flute and bass clarinet
- Suite: Puer apud magistros exercentur (2007) for 2 alto saxophones
- Allô! for 2 saxophones
- Oh là! for 2 saxophones
- Scat for 2 saxophones
- Ardente for viola and piano
- Un post-it pour Henri (2015/2022) for tenor saxophone and cello, or two cellos
- Femme le soir (2018) for cello and piano
- This is Love (2024) for cello and organ

== Solo works ==
- Episode No. 1 (1964) for flute
- Fusain (1971) for bass flute and piccolo
- Chanson d'approche (1972) for piano
- Autour (1972) for harpsichord
- B for Sonata (1973) for piano
- Scion (1973) for cello
- Tranche (1976) for harp
- Musique de jour (1976) for organ
- Episode No. 2 "ohne Worte" (1977) for flute
- Auprès (1980) for harpsichord
- Pièce pour Saint Germain (1981) for piano
- Calling E.C. (1982) for piano or two pianos
- Episode No. 3 (1982) for trumpet in C
- Episode No. 4 (1983) for tenor saxophone
- Petite suite sérieuse pour concert de famille (1983) for piano
- Episode No. 5 (1983) for cello
- Episode No. 6 (1984) for viola
- Episode No. 7 "night away" (1984) for electric guitar
- Episode No. 8 (1984) for double bass
- Tango Si (1984) for piano
- Une journee de Gadad, children's suite for piano (1984)
- Signets, hommage à Maurice Ravel (1987) for piano
- Episode No. 9 "Forte magnum colaraturum" (1990) for clarinet
- Pièce pour piano (1997)
- Petite Fantaisie for Leo (2001) for flute
- Pièces jay (2001) for piano
- O Bach! (2007) for piano
- Leçons du petit jour (2007) for organ
- Fancy for Anssi (2010) for cello
- Ravery (2015) for cello
- 3 x Toi (2018) for piano – dedicated to Nicolas Hodges

== Chorus ==
- Mass (1945) for choir, soloists and orchestra
- Motet I – To everything, there is a season (1947) for 7 women's voices
- Madrigal (1948) for choir
- Arbres (1950) for mixed choir a cappella
- Et le reste à l'avenant (1950) for mixed choir a cappella
- Everyone sings (1955) for double women's choir féminin et brass
- Enfantillages (1956) for women's or children's choir in 3 equal voices
- L'oeil égaré dans les plis de l'obéissance au vent, cantate radiophonique (1961) for soprano, contralto, baritone, mixed choir and orchestra
- Dans la chaleur vacante, cantate radiophonique (1963) for choir and orchestra
- Mots (1963) for vocal quintet and ensemble
- Motet II (1965) for chorus and ensemble
- Diurnes (1970) for mixed chorus of 12 to 72 voices
- Sonata for 12 mixed voices a cappella (1970)
- Perriault le déluné, comédie-madrigal for mixed choir of 3 times 4 voices a cappella (1993)
- Für Celia affettuoso (1998) for choir in 6 voices
- Motet III "Hunc igitur terrorem" (1999) for 5 solo voices, choir and Baroque orchestra
- Enfantillages (2000) new version with flute and women's or children's choir
- Autres enfantillages (2000) for children's or women's choir with clarinet ad libitum
- Chant dormant (2001) for choir
- Concerto-Fantaisie "O night, oh" (2001) – for mixed choir of 32 voices and concertante piano
- Motet IV "Ventosum Vocant" (2002) for soprano and quintet
- Femme en son jardin (2010) for vocal quartet, viola, cello and piano
- Orça for choir a cappella
- Savez-Vous Qui Est Mon Ami for chorus of three mixed voices

== Vocal ==
- Plupart du temps I, 6 melodies for mezzo-soprano and piano (1949)
- Chansons pour Paule (1951) for mezzo-soprano and piano
- Cinq poèmes de Jacques Dupin (1959) for soprano et piano or orchestra
- Mots (1963) for soprano and ensemble
- Quartet No. 2 (1964) for soprano and string trio
- Mon Ami (1974) for voice and piano
- Caprice for one voice (1975) for any male or female voice and piano, without pianist
- Caprice for two voices (1978) for mezzo-soprano and counter-tenor or contralto
- Liring Ballade (1980) for baritone and orchestra
- Plupart du temps II (1989) for tenor, tenor saxophone and cello
- Sigrancia-Ballade (1995) for baritone and orchestra
- Lovaby, concert aria from the opera Schliemann (2000) for soprano and orchestra
- Titivillus (2000) for mezzo-soprano, flute and piano or 2 flutes and piano
- Motet IV "Ventosum Vocant" (2002) for soprano, flute, clarinet, harp, violin and cello.
- L' Ascension du Mont Ventoux (2004) for soprano, narrator, flute, clarinet, violin, cello and harp
- D'un journal d'amour for soprano and viola (2009)
- Sur do: Hommage à Purcell pour quatuor vocal, alto et violoncelle (2010)
- Rambles for narrator/speaker, flute, clarinet, harp, violin and cello
- L'oeil égaré for baritone and piano
- Fredons for soprano and ensemble

== Reworkings of early music ==
- Heinrich Schütz / 8 Psaumes de Becker / No. 11 for string quartet, double bass, wind quintet, harp and piano or orchestra
- Heinrich Schütz / 8 Psaumes de Becker / No. 20 for wind quintet, string trio, viola, harp or orchestra
- Heinrich Schütz / 8 Psaumes de Becker / No. 47 for flute, clarinet, 2 violins, 2 violas and cello
- Heinrich Schütz / 8 Psaumes de Becker / No. 68 for flute, clarinet, 2 violins, 2 violas and cello
- Heinrich Schütz / 8 Psaumes de Becker / No. 84 for flute, bassoon, piano and string quartet
- Heinrich Schütz / 8 Psaumes de Becker / No. 92 for oboe, clarinet, bassoon, horn and string quartet or orchestra
- Heinrich Schütz / 8 Psaumes de Becker / No. 97 for wind quintet, string trio
- Heinrich Schütz / 8 Psaumes de Becker / No. 121 for flute, piano and string quartet or orchestra
- Lassus Ricercare (1970) for brass, percussion, harp and pianos
- Orlandus Lassus / 3 Psaumes de Ulenberg
- Pierluigi Palestrina / Assumpta est Maria motet, for flute, clarinet, harp and string trio
- Guillaume Dufay / Flos Florum motet for wind quintet
- Johannes Brasart / O Flos Fragrans motet for wind quintet
- Josquin des Prés / Suite brève
- Jean Sébastien Bach / 14 Goldberg canons for flute, oboe, clarinet, string trio and double bass
- Jean Sébastien Bach – Contrapunctus IV (The Art of Fugue) (2001) for chamber orchestra and vocal quartet
