= Erik L'Heureux =

American aerchitect and academic

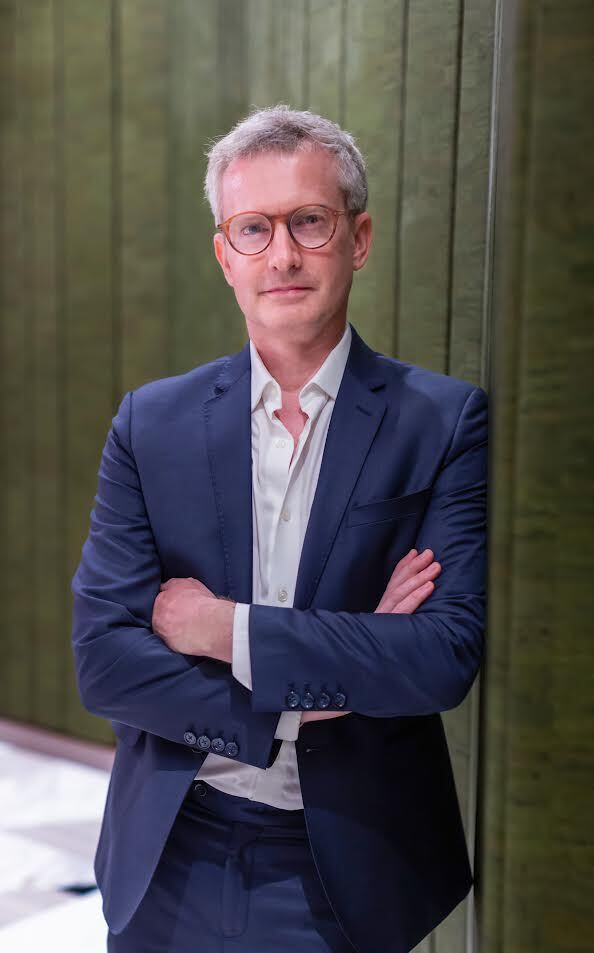
- Education: Washington University in St. Louis; Princeton University; Royal Melbourne Institute of Technology
- Occupation: Architect
- Employers: Monash University; NUS; Cooper Union; Washington University
- Awards: Wheelwright Prize

Erik G. L'Heureux is an American architect, educator, and academic who focuses on equatorial architecture, urbanism, and sustainable design. His work has won the Wheelwright Prize, the Holcim Foundation Bronze Award for Sustainable Construction, and design awards from the American Institute of Architects and the Society of American Registered Architects.

L'Heureux is a professor and head of the Department of Architecture at Monash University. Through Equator Works, the design firm he founded, he works on independent projects that focus on sustainability and climate-responsive architecture in the equatorial belt.

== Education ==
L'Heureux earned his Bachelor of Arts in Architecture from the Sam Fox School of Design & Visual Arts at Washington University in St. Louis, where he graduated summa cum laude. He later received a Master of Architecture from Princeton University School of Architecture and a Doctorate in Architecture and Design from the Royal Melbourne Institute of Technology. His doctoral research focused on equatorial building envelopes and tropical urbanization, earning him the RMIT Prize for Research Excellence.

== Career ==
From 2003 to 2025, L'Heureux was a faculty member at the National University of Singapore (NUS), where he taught courses on equatorial architecture, envelope design, and Southeast Asian urbanism, and was also the Vice Dean for Special Projects and Director of the Master of Architecture program. L'Heureux served as lead designer on the NUS campus, retrofitting the Equatorial School of Architecture (SDE 1 & 3), a net-zero energy adaptive reuse project, which won the AIA New York City Design Merit Award in 2025 and INDE Award for Best of 2021, Learning Space in Australia. L'Heureux also designed the retrofit of the Yusof Ishak House, a 1979 building transformed into a net-zero energy structure.

In 2025, L'Heureux was appointed professor and head of the Department of Architecture at Monash University in Melbourne Australia.

A recipient of the Ruth and Norman Moore visiting professorship at Washington University in St. Louis, L'Heureux has lectured on sustainable design and equatorial architecture topics. Earlier in his career, he taught at the Irwin S. Chanin School of Architecture at Cooper Union in New York.

== Research ==
L'Heureux's research explores the intersection of climate, architecture, and urbanism, focusing on hot and wet climates, particularly in equatorial cities. His research looks at ways to develop forms and building envelopes that can respond to extreme conditions by integrating climatic elements, such as light, breeze, and shade, into the design. L'Heureux led the "1000 Singapore's" project, which explores the compact city model as a sustainable urban form.

== Projects ==
=== Equatorial School of Architecture ===
==== SDE1 and SDE3 · National University of Singapore (2015–2023) ====
SDE1 and SDE3 · National University of Singapore (2015–2023)

L’Heureux served as lead designer of the Equatorial School of Architecture at the National University of Singapore, a redevelopment of two 1970s buildings known as SDE1 and SDE3. Developed in collaboration with the university and CPG Consultants between 2015 and 2023, the project involved the adaptive reuse of approximately 24,000 square metres of existing building space for design studios, workshops, research facilities and administrative offices. The refurbished buildings were formally launched in February 2023.

L’Heureux’s design retained the original building structures while reconfiguring their façades and environmental systems for Singapore’s tropical climate. A deep external shading screen along the west-facing façade limits direct solar exposure while allowing natural daylight into the interiors. The project also incorporates rooftop photovoltaic panels and a hybrid cooling system that supplies fresh, pre-cooled air at higher temperatures than conventional air-conditioning systems, supplemented by ceiling fans. In SDE3, L’Heureux designed a sculptural staircase that connects the design studios and provides spaces for informal interaction.

In 2025, his project received a Merit Award in the Architecture category of the AIA New York Design Awards, following the Society of Façade Engineers’ 2024 Project of the Year award for International Sustainability. The SDE3 design had also received a Merit Award in the Unbuilt category of the 2020 AIA New York State Design Awards.

SDE1 received the Best of the Best and Learning Space awards at the 2021 INDE.Awards, while SDE1 and SDE3 received a 2021 International Architecture Award. In 2023, the buildings received Singapore Institute of Architects Architectural Design Awards. The wider NUS cluster, including SDE4, also received the 2023 ULI Asia Pacific and Global Awards for Excellence. The project was shortlisted for the 2024 World Architecture Festival and received recognition for its environmental performance through BCA Green Mark certifications.

=== Equatorial Student Commons ===
==== Yusof Ishak House · National University of Singapore · 2020–2025 ====
Yusof Isak House National University of Singapore · 2020–2025

Erik L’Heureux led the refurbishment of Yusof Ishak House at the National University of Singapore, working with the university’s Campus Design Innovations Group and architectural consultant AWP Architects. The project, undertaken between 2020 and 2025, retained much of the existing concrete structure and reorganized the building to accommodate student activities, study areas and communal spaces. It officially reopened on 15 October 2025. L’Heureux’s design adapted six existing vaulted arches to improve airflow through the central atrium. Screened clerestory openings and perforated sunscreens support natural ventilation, while fluted precast panels and vertical fins provide shade along the façade. The building combines naturally ventilated communal areas with hybrid-cooled multipurpose rooms. Rooftop solar panels contribute to its near net-zero energy target, while retaining the original structure reduced the need for new construction materials.

The project received the Bronze Holcim Award for Asia Pacific in 2023 and an Honor Award in the International Projects category of the 2025 AIA New York State Design Awards, recognising L’Heureux’s work with the NUS Campus Design Innovations Group.

=== A Simple Headquarters ===
==== Wearnes Automotive Headquarters ·Singapore (2019) ====
Wearnes Automotive Headquarters · Singapore · 2019

A Simple Headquarters is a nine-storey office building for Wearnes Automotive on Leng Kee Road, Singapore. Designed by L’Heureux of Pencil Office in collaboration with Team Design Architects, it was completed in 2019 and has a gross floor area of approximately 18,642 square metres. The building is set behind the company's automobile showrooms.

L’Heureux designed the exterior as a screen of custom-extruded aluminium fins arranged in a repeating W-shaped pattern derived from the Wearnes name. The angled fins provide shade, conceal mechanical services and allow air to circulate through the building. Six of the nine floors are naturally ventilated. The screen also extends around a five-storey automobile display frame.

The interior centres on a three-storey atrium used for reception and meetings. A lattice of slender white tubes surrounds the atrium, which is illuminated by an overhead oculus. An open staircase connects the office floors.

The building received a Merit Award in the International category of the 2020 AIA New York State Design Awards and an Excellence Award in the 2020 SARA National Design Awards.

=== Park Place · Desa ParkCity · Kuala Lumpur · Malaysia ===
Park Place · Desa ParkCity · Kuala Lumpur · Malaysia

Equatorial Tower, also known as Park Place, is a residential development in Desa ParkCity, Kuala Lumpur. The project was designed by L’Heureux in collaboration with ShafikZaman Architect. Its Y-shaped plan comprises three residential wings extending from a central circulation core, set within landscaped grounds. The façades are articulated by projecting vertical fins and horizontal ledges that shade the apartments and frame the three wings. Layers of V-profile ledges form a crown at the top of the building. Landscaped entrance lounges connect the residential tower to the ground, while a facilities deck above the parking podium accommodates a swimming pool, communal spaces and planted areas. The building’s environmental strategy uses the deep external screen to moderate solar exposure, provide privacy and encourage airflow. Communal sky gardens introduce naturally ventilated gathering spaces at the upper levels.

Park Place received a Silver PAM Award in the Multiple Residential High Rise category in 2026. The project was also shortlisted in The Multi Residential Building category of the 2026 INDE.Awards.

=== A Simple Factory Building Singapore · 2012 ===
A Simple Factory Building is an industrial building in Singapore designed by Erik L’Heureux

A Simple Factory Building is an industrial building in Singapore designed by L’Heureux and completed in 2012. Its design addresses the competing requirements of solar protection and an open, glazed interior within an industrial setting. A bronze-coloured, full-height glazed envelope is shaded by an external screen approximately 1.2 metres deep.

The lightweight screen, fabricated using an exterior insulation and finish system, wraps continuously across the front façade, entrance porch ceiling, roof and rear elevation. Its changing pattern controls sunlight and views, opening towards a neighbouring park while screening parts of the surrounding industrial area. Variations in the openings correspond to the privacy requirements of the spaces behind them.

The building received a Merit Award in the Architecture category of the 2012 AIA New York Design Awards. The award credited Pencil Office and ARYA Architects.

The building won the Production, Energy and Recycling category for completed projects at the 2013 World Architecture Festival. NUS’s published project record also lists a 2013 FuturArc Green Leadership Award and a 2010 AIA New York State Design Merit Award in the Unbuilt category.

== Selected bibliography ==
=== Books ===
- L'Heureux, Erik G. (2014). Deep veils (1st ed.). San Raphael: ORO editions. ISBN 978-1-941806-34-0.
- L'Heureux, E. G; Khoo, P. B (2015). 1000 Singapores: Eight Points of the Compact City (1st ed.). Design Singapore Council. ISBN 9789810985769.
- L'Heureux, Erik; Cossu, Giovanni, eds. (2022). Renovating Carbon: Re-imagining the Carbon Form (1st ed.). Novato: Oro Editions. ISBN 978-1-954081-44-4. OCLC 1374561227.
- Ryan, Daniel J.; Ferng, Jennifer; L'Heureux, Erik G.; Chee, Lilian, eds. (2022). Drawing climate: visualising invisible elements of architecture. Basel: Birkhäuser. ISBN 978-3-0356-2460-1. OCLC 1285317274.
- L'Heureux, Erik (2025). Hot Air. Applied Research & Design. p. 230. ISBN 9781961856035.

=== Journal articles ===
- Erik, L'Heureux (1 January 2012). "Between the Open and Closed: A Simple Factory Building for the Tropics". Proceedings of 4th International Network for Tropical Architecture Conference: Tropics 2050.
- L'Heureux, Erik (2019-10-02). "Hot and Wet: Architectures of the Equator". Drawing on: Journal of Architectural Research by Design. 3: 77–90. doi:10.2218/csdcq829. ISSN 2059-9978.
- Ferng, Jennifer; Chang, Jiat-Hwee; L'Heureux, Erik; Ryan, Daniel J. (2020-07-02). "Climatic Design and Its Others: "Southern" Perspectives in the Age of the Anthropocene". Journal of Architectural Education. 74 (2): 250–262. doi:10.1080/10464883.2020.1790935. ISSN 1046-4883.
- Ferng, Jennifer; L'Heureux, Erik (2022). "Background Building: A Net Zero Energy and Super-Low Carbon Adaptive Reuse at the National University of Singapore". Future Anterior. 19 (1): 68–90. doi:10.1353/fta.2022.a924440. ISSN 1934-6026.
- L'Heureux, Erik. "Inheriting Climate: Review of Climate Inheritance, by Rania Ghosn and El Hadi Jazairy (DESIGN EARTH), New York, Actar Publishers, 2023, 152 pp., ISBN 978-1-6384-0099-8". Architectural Theory Review. 0: 1–4. doi:10.1080/13264826.2024.2403178. ISSN 1326-4826.
