= Miho Mazereeuw =

Architect and urban planner

- Born: Miho Mazereeuw

Academic background
- Education: Harvard Graduate School of Design and Wesleyan University
- Thesis: (2013)

Miho Mazereeuw is an Associate Professor of Architecture and Urbanism in the Department of Architecture at MIT where she also directs the Urban Risk Lab. Mazereeuw is most known for her work in disaster risk reduction.

== Early life and education ==
Mazereeuw, who is part Dutch and part Japanese, grew up in Malaysia, South Korea, and Singapore. She received a Bachelor of Arts in Sculpture and Environmental Science from Wesleyan University. While in college in 1995, she visited Kobe, Japan where her parents had recently moved after the Great Hanshin Earthquake. She then earned her Master in Architecture and Landscape Architecture from the Harvard Graduate School of Design (GSD). For her thesis, Mazereeuw designed an emergency infrastructure system as part of a subway station design, akin to the Urban Risk Lab's PrepHub project. Much of her research interest centers on coastal areas in the Pacific Rim of Fire.

== Work ==
Mazereeuw's experience in design practice include working in the offices of Shigeru Ban and Dan Kiley as well as an associate position at the Office for Metropolitan Architecture. Before joining MIT, she taught at Harvard's GSD and the University of Toronto. As the director of MIT's Urban Risk Lab, she leads multiple regional, national and international scale projects focusing on questions of resilience, design, and technology to improve disaster preparedness.

The Urban Risk Lab's interdisciplinary work incorporates local communities, nonprofits, governments, educational institutions, and international corporations to develop "methods, prototypes and technologies to embed risk reduction and preparedness into the design of cities and regions to increase the resilience of local communities." Previous collaborations includes those with FEMA, USAID, Broward County, Florida, Tata Center, Line, Neighborhood Empowerment Network, Singapore University of Technology and Design, and the Resichauer Institute of Japanese Studies at Harvard University. In 2016, the Urban Risk Lab was profiled in Fast Company for their partnership with San Francisco to create PrepHub, a pilot urban resilience infrastructure project.

== Projects ==
- Resilient San Francisco 2080
- PrepHub
- Housing Pre-Planning Toolkit
- Urban Risk Map

== Awards ==
- Janet Darling Webel Prize, Harvard GSD
- Charles Eliot Traveling Fellowship in Landscape Architecture, Harvard GSD
- 2017 - LafargeHolcim Awards Acknowledgement Prize: Water Collective: Multifunctional Public Space in Thecho, Nepal
- Wheelwright Prize 2006-2007, Harvard GSD
