= Elisa Silva (architect) =

American-Venezuelan architect

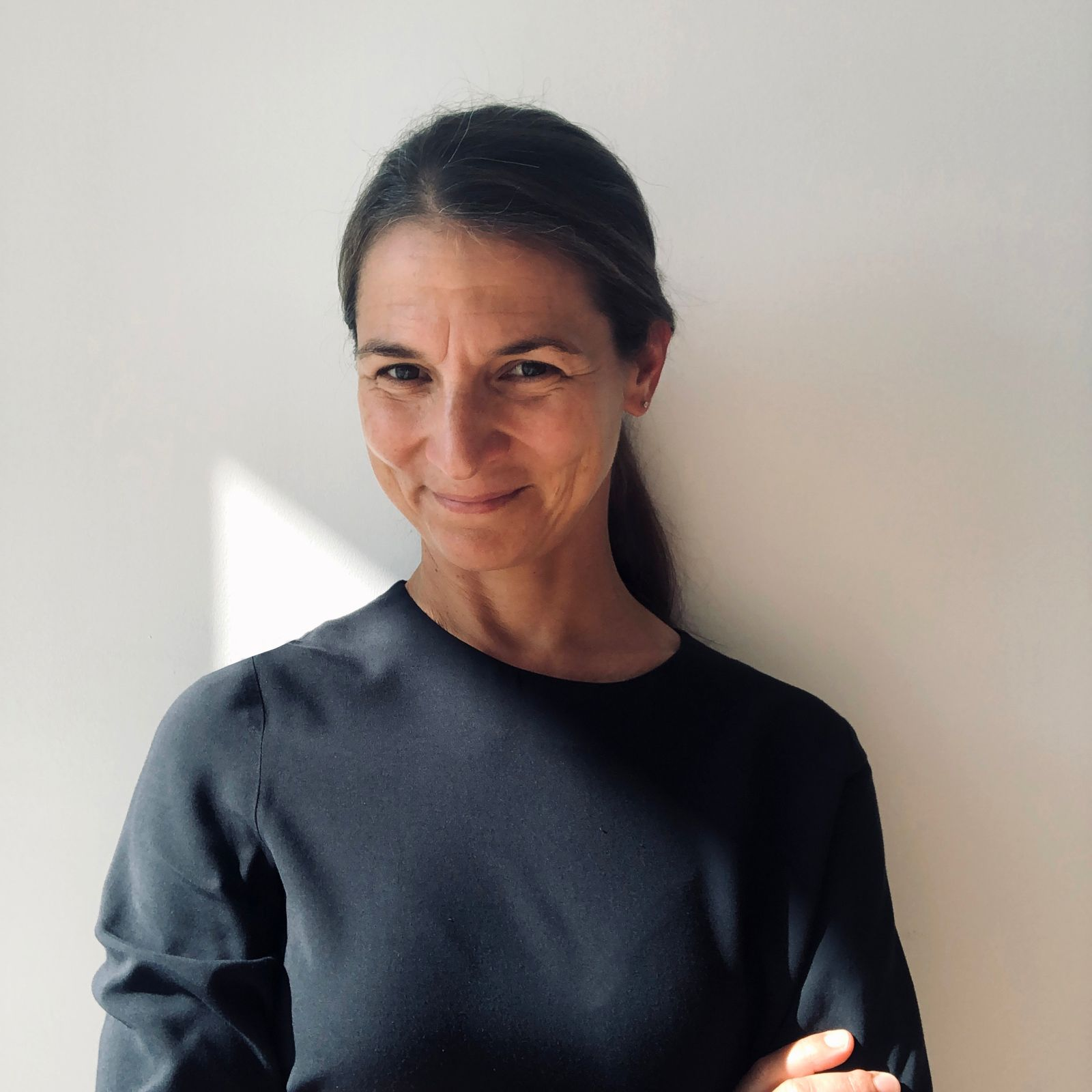
- Born: May 28, 1975 (age 51); St. Louis, Missouri
- Education: Emory University, Harvard University
- Awards: 2011 Wheelwright Prize

Elisa Silva (St. Louis, 1975) is an American-Venezuelan architect. She received the Wheelwright Prize in 2011.

== Biography ==
Silva lived her childhood between Maracaibo, Venezuela, and St. Louis, Missouri. In 1998, she graduated in Chemistry and Art history from Emory University in Atlanta, Georgia, and then obtained the Master in Architecture from Harvard University, graduating in 2002, where she was awarded the Alpha Rho Chi Medal.

In 2007, she founded the architecture firm Enlace Arquitectura, a Caracas-based multidisciplinary professional practice in architecture, urban design and landscape architecture. Ten years later, she founded Enlace Foundation, an NGO that promotes cultural and educational programs of social inclusion and processes of participatory design together with multiple cultural, civic and professional partners.

Enlace's work has been exhibited at the Venice Biennale of Architecture 2021 and the Chicago Architecture Biennial of the same year. Moreover, the firm was awarded at the Chile Architecture Biennial 2017 and the Ibero-American Biennial of Architecture and Urbanism 2019.

She is currently associate professor at Florida International University with a joint appointment in the Department of Architecture and the FIU Wolfsonian Public Humanities Lab. She has taught architecture at Princeton University, University of Toronto, Harvard GSD, the Universidad Simón Bolívar and the Central University in Venezuela.

== Recognitions ==
In 2005, Silva received the Rome Prize from the American Academy. Six year later, she received the Wheelwright Prize 2011, formerly known as Wheelwright Fellowship Award, a traveling fellowship granted by Harvard GSD. Moreover, she has been awarded the Graham Foundation Grant in 2017 and 2021 and the Lucas Artist Fellowship 2019. In 2023, she was named one of the three AFIELD fellows alongside Louis Oke-Agbo and Necati Sönmez.

== Publications ==
- CABA Cartography of the Caracas Barrios 1966-2014 (co-author, Fundación Espacio, 2015)
- Pro-Inclusion: Practical tools for the integral development of Latin American cities (co-author, CAF Latin American Development Bank, 2016)
- Pure Space: Expanding the Public Sphere Through Public Space Transformations in Latin American Spontaneous Settlements (Actar Publishers, 2020)
