= List of members of the American Academy of Arts and Letters Department of Art =

This List of members of the American Academy of Arts and Letters Department of Art shows the members of one of the three departments of the American Academy of Arts and Letters.

After being nominated by current members, new members are selected in two elections, the first by the department they join (Art, Literature or Music). Candidates who receive the most votes in their own department are then voted on by the entire membership.

== Current members ==
Name	Elected
Robert Adams	2014
Lynda Benglis	2012
Vija Celmins	1996
Mark Di Suvero	1986
Elizabeth Diller	2012
Jim Dine	1980
Lois Dodd	1998
Rackstraw Downes	1999
Nicole Eisenman	2018
Peter Eisenman	2001
Eric Fischl	2006
Kenneth Frampton	2012
Mary Frank	1984
Robert Gober	2012
Red Grooms	2000
Ann Hamilton	2014
Mary Heilmann	2017
Steven Holl	2000
Jenny Holzer	2018
Bill Jensen	2014
Jasper Johns	1973
Joan Jonas	2016
Alex Katz	1988
Maya Lin	2005
Robert Mangold	2001
Sylvia Plimack Mangold	2011
Thom Mayne	2010
Julie Mehretu	2017
Richard Meier	1983
Catherine Murphy	2002
Bruce Nauman	2001
Laurie Olin	2005
Judy Pfaff	2009
Martin Puryear	1992
Paul Resika	1994
Dorothea Rockburne	2001
Edward Ruscha	2001
David Salle	2016
Peter Saul	2010
Annabelle Selldorf	2017
Cindy Sherman	2005
Kiki Smith	2005
Pat Steir	2016
Robert A. M. Stern	2011
Sarah Sze	2018
Billie Tsien	2007
James Turrell	2011
Richard Tuttle	2013
Ursula von Rydingsvard	2008
Kara Walker	2012
Stanley Whitney	2017
Tod Williams	2009
Terry Winters	2013

== Deceased members ==
Name	Life	Elected
Edwin Austin Abbey	1852–1911	1898
Herbert Adams	1858–1945	1898
Wayman Adams	1883–1959	1929
David Adler	1882–1949	1946
Robert Ingersoll Aitken	1878–1949	1915
Josef Albers	1888–1976	1968
Ivan Albright	1897–1983	1957
Chester Holmes Aldrich	1871–1940	1937
John White Alexander	1856–1915	1898
Edmond Amateis	1897–1981	1952
Alexander Archipenko	1887–1964	1962
John Taylor Arms	1887–1953	1932
Louis Ayres	1874–1947	1944
George Fletcher Babb	1836–1915	1907
Henry Bacon	1866–1924	1913
Peggy Bacon	1895–1987	1956
William Bailey	1930–2020	1986
John Baldessari	1931–2020	2008
Hugo Ballin	1879–1956	1908
George Gray Barnard	1863–1938	1908
Edward Larrabee Barnes	1915–2004	1991
Frederic Clay Bartlett	1873–1953	1916
Jennifer Bartlett	1941–2022	2003
Paul Wayland Bartlett	1865–1925	1908
Leonard Baskin	1922–2000	1963
Chester Beach	1881–1956	1918
Gifford Beal	1879–1956	1923
Romare Bearden	1912–1988	1972
Cecilia Beaux	1855–1942	1930
James Carroll Beckwith	1852–1917	1898
George Wesley Bellows	1882–1925	1918
Pietro Belluschi	1899–1994	1955
Frank Weston Benson	1862–1951	1911
Thomas Hart Benton	1889–1975	1942
Eugene Berman	1899–1972	1964
Leonid Berman	1896–1976	1976
Louis Betts	1873–1961	1912
George Biddle	1885–1973	1961
Albert Bierstadt	1830–1902	1898
Elmer Bischoff	1916–1991	1988
Isabel Bishop	1902–1988	1944
Karl Bitter	1867–1915	1910
Edwin Blashfield	1848–1936	1898
Hyman Bloom	1913–2009	1974
Robert Frederick Blum	1857–1903	1898
Peter Blume	1906–1992	1951
Varujan Boghosian	1926–2020	1986
Ilya Bolotowsky	1907–1981	1982
Lee Bontecou	1931–2022	2004
Charles Louis Borie Jr.	1871–1943	1937
Louis Bouche	1896–1969	1983
Louise Bourgeois	1911–2010	1983
Marcel Breuer	1902–1981	1965
Alexander Brook	1898–1980	1942
James Brooks	1906–1992	1973
Richard E. Brooks	1865–1919	1908
Arthur Brown Jr.	1874–1957	1940
Glenn Brown	1854–1932	1909
George Elmer Browne	1871–1946	1929
Edward Bruce	1879–1943	1939
Arnold W. Brunner	1857–1925	1913
George de Forest Brush	1855–1941	1898
William Gedney Bunce	1840–1916	1898
Gordon Bunshaft	1909–1990	1960
Charles E. Burchfield	1893–1967	1943
David Burliuk	1882–1967	1967
Daniel Burnham	1846–1912	1906
Howard Russell Butler	1856–1934	1916
Paul Cadmus	1904–1999	1975
Alexander Calder	1898–1976	1960
Alexander Stirling Calder	1870–1945	1916
Emil Carlsen	1853–1932	1908
John M. Carrere	1858–1911	1908
Federico Castellon	1914–1971	1968
Giorgio Cavallon	1904–1989	1988
John Chamberlain	1927–2011	1990
William Merritt Chase	1849–1916	1898
Christo	1935–2020	1989
Allan Clark	1896–1950	1931
Gilmore David Clarke	1892–1982	1937
Ralph Clarkson	1861–1942	1912
Chuck Close	1940–2021	1992
Henry N. Cobb	1926–2020	1980
Timothy Cole	1852–1931	1908
Alfred Q. Collins	1855–1903	1898
Walter Cook	1846–1916	1908
Gardner Cox	1906–1988	1957
Kenyon Cox	1856–1919	1898
Ralph Adams Cram	1863–1942	1915
Paul Philippe Cret	1876–1945	1936
John Walter Cross	1878–1951	1947
Frederic Crowninshield	1845–1918	1908
John Steuart Curry	1897–1946	1942
Cyrus Dallin	1861–1944	1916
Peter Dalton	1894–1972	1952
William Turner Dannat	1853–1929	1898
Jo Davidson	1883–1952	1944
Stuart Davis	1894–1964	1956
Frank Miles Day	1861–1918	1908
Joseph DeCamp	1858–1923	1908
Jose de Creeft	1884–1982	1955
Willem de Kooning	1904–1997	1960
Jean de Marco	1898–1990	1959
Adolph Dehn	1895–1968	1965
William Adams Delano	1874–1960	1931
Donald De Lue	1898–1988	1946
Charles Melville Dewey	1849–1937	1908
Thomas Dewing	1851–1938	1908
Edwin Dickinson	1891–1978	1956
Sidney Dickinson	1890–1980	1931
Richard Diebenkorn	1922–1993	1967
Richard Hunt	1935–2023	1998
William Hunt Diederich	1884–1953	1938
Frederick Dielman	1847–1935	1908
John M. Donaldson	1854–1941	1910
Paul Dougherty	1877–1947	1908
Guy Pène du Bois	1884–1958	1942
Marcel Duchamp	1887–1968	1960
Frank DuMond	1865–1951	1918
Frank Duveneck	1848–1919	1898
Charles Eames	1907–1978	1977
Kerr Eby	1889–1946	1937
George Wharton Edwards	1869–1950	1925
Thomas Harlan Ellett	1880–1951	1943
Aymar Embury II	1880–1966	1946
Jimmy Ernst	1920–1984	1983
Rudulph Evans	1878–1960	1926
Philip Evergood	1901–1973	1959
Barry Faulkner	1881–1962	1920
Lyonel Feininger	1871–1956	1955
John Flanagan	1865–1952	1923
John Fulton Folinsbee	1892–1972	1953
Ben Foster	1852–1926	1908
Sam Francis	1923–1994	1980
Robert Frank	1924–2019	2016
James Earle Fraser	1876–1953	1915
Laura Gardin Fraser	1889–1966	1931
Daniel Chester French	1850–1931	1898
Leo Friedlander	1888–1966	1953
R. Buckminster Fuller	1895–1983	1963
Naum Gabo	1890–1977	1965
Daniel Garber	1880–1958	1948
Lee Gatch	1902–1968	1966
Walter Gay	1856–1937	1898
Frank O. Gehry	1929–2025	1987
Charles Dana Gibson	1867–1944	1898
Cass Gilbert	1859–1934	1906
William Glackens	1870–1938	1936
Leon Golub	1922–2004	2002
Bertram Goodhue	1869–1924	1915
Adolph Gottlieb	1903–1974	1972
Charles Grafly	1862–1929	1908
Morris Graves	1910–2001	1957
Nancy Graves	1940–1995	1990
Cleve Gray	1918–2004	1998
Dorothea Greenbaum	1893–1986	1968
Balcomb Greene	1904–1990	1976
John Gregory	1879–1958	1930
Eliot Gregory	1854–1915	1898
Walter Griffin	1861–1935	1923
Albert Lorey Groll	1866–1952	1932
Walter Gropius	1883–1969	1962
Chaim Gross	1904–1991	1964
George Grosz	1893–1959	1954
Jules Guerin	1866–1946	1908
Eric Gugler	1889–1974	1942
Philip Guston	1913–1980	1972
Charles Gwathmey	1938–2009	1976
Robert Gwathmey	1903–1988	1971
Dimitri Hadzi	1921–2006	1983
Walker Kirkland Hancock	1901–1999	1941
Henry Janeway Hardenbergh	1847–1918	1908
Hugh Hardy	1932–2017	1993
L. Birge Harrison	1854–1929	1908
T. Alexander Harrison	1853–1930	1898
Wallace Harrison	1895–1981	1960
Herbert Haseltine	1877–1962	1935
Childe Hassam	1859–1935	1898
Thomas Hastings	1860–1929	1906
Charles Webster Hawthorne	1872–1930	1920
Al Held	1928–2005	1984
John Heliker	1909–2000	1969
Robert Henri	1865–1929	1908
Eugene Higgins	1874–1958	1943
Joseph Hirsch	1910–1981	1967
Al Hirschfeld	1903–2003	2003
Malvina Hoffman	1885–1966	1937
Hans Hofmann	1880–1966	1964
Winslow Homer	1836–1910	1905
Charles Hopkinson	1869–1962	1935
Edward Hopper	1882–1967	1945
Donal Hord	1902–1966	1950
Cecil Howard	1888–1956	1938
John Galen Howard	1864–1931	1908
William Henry Howe	1846–1929	1908
John Mead Howells	1868–1959	1911
Anna Hyatt Huntington	1876–1973	1927
Robert Irwin	1928–2023	2007
Samuel Isham	1855–1914	1908
Yvonne Jacquette	1934–2023	2003
Albert Jaegers	1868–1925	1912
C. Paul Jennewein	1890–1978	1931
John C. Johansen	1876–1964	1930
Philip Johnson	1906–2005	1963
Lester Johnson	1919–2010	2004
Francis Coates Jones	1857–1932	1908
Hugh Bolton Jones	1848–1927	1908
Robert Edmond Jones	1887–1954	1933
Louis Kahn	1901–1974	1964
Wolf Kahn	1927–2020	1984
William Sergeant Kendall	1869–1938	1908
William Mitchell Kendall	1856–1941	1914
Rockwell Kent	1882–1971	1964
György Kepes	1906–2002	1968
Dan Kiley	1912–2004	1996
R. B. Kitaj	1932–2007	1982
Karl Knaths	1891–1971	1955
John Koch	1909–1978	1970
Henry Kreis	1899–1963	1951
Leon Kroll	1884–1974	1930
Albert Laessle	1877–1954	1931
Bancel La Farge	1865–1938	1898
John La Farge	1835–1910	1898
William F. Lamb	1883–1952	1950
Armin Landeck	1905–1984	1946
Ibram Lassaw	1911–2003	1984
Francis Lathrop	1849–1909	1898
Gertrude K. Lathrop	1896–1986	1949
Robert Laurent	1890–1970	1970
Jacob Lawrence	1917–2000	1965
Lee Lawrie	1877–1963	1931
Ernest Lawson	1873–1939	1918
Rico Lebrun	1900–1964	1960
Clare Leighton	1898–1989	1951
Alfred Leslie	1927–2023	2006
Julian Levi	1900–1982	1959
David Levine	1926–2009	1983
Jack Levine	1915–2010	1956
Roy Lichtenstein	1923–1997	1979
Jonas Lie	1880–1940	1929
Harrie T. Lindeberg	1880–1959	1948
Richard Lindner	1901–1978	1972
Jacques Lipchitz	1891–1973	1961
Richard Lippold	1915–2002	1963
Seymour Lipton	1903–1986	1975
DeWitt McClellan Lockman	1870–1957	1931
Louis Loeb	1866–1909	1908
Will Hicok Low	1853–1932	1908
Frederick William MacMonnies	1863–1937	1898
Brice Marden	1938–2023	1998
Charles Follen McKim	1847–1909	1898
Gari Melchers	1860–1932	1898
Harry Siddons Mowbray	1858–1928	1898
Thomas Nozkowski	1944–2019	2010
Claes Oldenburg	1929–2022	1975
Charles Sprague Pearce	1851–1914	1898
Philip Pearlstein	1924–2022	1982
I.M. Pei	1917–2019	1963
Cesar Pelli	1926–2019	1982
James Polshek	1930–2022	2005
Benjamin Curtis Porter	1843–1908	1898
Edward Clark Potter	1857–1923	1898
Howard Pyle	1853–1911	1898
Robert Reid	1862–1929	1898
Frederic Remington	1861–1909	1898
Kevin Roche	1922–2019	1970
Susan Rothenberg	1945–2020	1990
Frederick Ruckstull	1853–1942	1898
Robert Ryman	1930–2019	1994
Augustus Saint-Gaudens	1848–1907	1898
Richard Serra	1938–2024	1995
Joel Shapiro	1941–2025	1998
Edward Simmons	1852–1931	1898
Abbott Handerson Thayer	1849–1921	1898
Wayne Thiebaud	1920–2021	1986
John Henry Twachtman	1853–1902	1898
Elihu Vedder	1836–1923	1898
Frederic Porter Vinton	1846–1911	1898
Henry Oliver Walker	1843–1929	1898
Horatio Walker	1858–1938	1898
J. Alden Weir	1852–1919	1898

== See also ==
- List of members of the American Academy of Arts and Letters Department of Literature
- List of members of the American Academy of Arts and Letters Department of Music
