= Betsy Jolas =

French and American composer (born 1926)

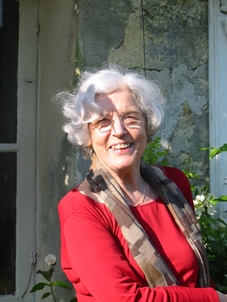
- Betsy Jolas in 2006
- Born: 5 August 1926 (age 100); Paris, France
- Occupation: Composer

Elizabeth MacDonald Jolas (born 5 August 1926) is a French and American composer.

== Life and career ==
Jolas was born in Paris on 5 August 1926. Her mother, the American translator Maria McDonald, also studied singing. Together with Betsy's father, the poet and journalist Eugene Jolas, she founded and edited the magazine transition, which published over ten years many of the great writers of the interwar period.

Her family settled in the United States in late 1940. While completing her general studies in New York, then specializing in music at Bennington College, she joined the Dessoff Choirs, discovering Renaissance music, which had a lasting influence on her work.

After graduating from Bennington College, Jolas returned to Paris in 1946 to continue her studies at the Conservatoire national supérieur de musique, notably with Darius Milhaud and Olivier Messiaen. From 1971 to 1974 she served as Messiaen's assistant at the Conservatoire, and in 1975 was appointed to the faculty. She has since then also taught in the U.S., at Yale, Harvard, Mills College, the University of California, Tanglewood, and the University of Michigan.

Jolas is a member of the American Academy of Arts and Letters and the American Academy of Arts and Sciences.

Her numerous works (she has been composing steadily since 1945) are written for a great variety of combinations and have been widely performed, by artists such as Kent Nagano, Anssi Karttunen, Claude Delangle, William Christie, Håkan Hardenberger, Antoine Tamestit, Nicolas Hodges, and Sir Simon Rattle, and ensembles and orchestras including the Ensemble intercontemporain, the Berlin Philharmonic, the Orchestre de Paris, the Boston Symphony Orchestra, and the BBC Symphony Orchestra.

=== Personal life ===
Jolas married the physician Gabriel Illouz in 1949; the pair had three children. She retains dual U.S./French citizenship. On 5 August 2026, Jolas turned 100.

== Style ==
Descriptions of Jolas's style note her early experience of 16th-century Western European polyphonic vocal music (in particular, that of Orlando di Lasso), continual exploration of vocality encompassing both vocal and instrumental works, and a flexible but steady flow free from conventional metric pulse. Though drawn to some aesthetic aspects of the serialism of her close contemporary Pierre Boulez and others, Jolas has remained an independent figure who never adopted serial technique.

== List of major works ==
- For an extended list, see List of compositions by Betsy Jolas.

=== Operas ===
- Le Pavillon au Bord de la Rivière (1975), chamber opera in 4 acts
- Schliemann (1982–83), opera in 3 acts
- Le Cyclope (1986), chamber opera in 1 act

=== Orchestral ===
- D'un opéra de voyage (1967) for chamber orchestra
- Quatre Plages (1967) for string orchestra
- Well Met (1973) for string orchestra
- Tales of a summer sea (1977) for orchestra
- Cinq pièces pour Boulogne (1982)
- B Day (2006) for symphony orchestra
- A Little Summer Suite (2015)
- Les Belles Années (The Good Years) (2023) (World premiere 14 June 2023, LSO, Barbican, London, as a gift to Sir Simon Rattle on elevation to Conductor Emeritus of the LSO)

=== Solo works with orchestra or ensemble ===
- Points D'Aube (1968) for viola and ensemble
- Musique d'hiver (1971) for organ and small orchestra
- Trois Rencontres (1973) for solo string trio and symphony orchestra
- Stances (1978) for piano and orchestra
- Histoires vraies (2015) double concerto for trumpet and piano
- Side Roads (2017) for cello and string orchestra
- b Tunes for Nicolas (2021) piano concerto for Nicolas Hodges and BBC Symphony Orchestra

=== Works for large ensemble ===
- Figures (1965) for 9 instruments
- J.D.E. (1966) for 14 musicians
- D'un opéra de poupée en sept musiques (1982) for 11 instruments
- Préludes, Fanfares, Interludes, Sonneries (1983) for wind band
- Sonate à 8 (1998) for cello octet

=== Chamber music ===
- Quartets Nos. 1–6 (1956–1997)
- O Wall (1976) for wind quintet
- Quatuor VII (Afterthoughts) (2018) for trumpet, violin, viola and cello
- Episode No. 1–9 (1964–1990) for various solo instruments
- B for Sonata (1973) for piano
- Musique de jour (1976) for organ
- Signets, hommage à Maurice Ravel (1987) for piano
- Femme le soir (2018) for cello and piano

=== Chorus ===
- Mass (1945) for choir, soloists and orchestra
- Motet I–IV (1947–2002) for various voices, chorus, orchestra, ensemble
- Enfantillages (1956) for women's or children's choir in 3 equal voices
- L'oeil égaré dans les plis de l'obéissance au vent, cantate radiophonique (1961) for soprano, contralto, baritone, mixed choir and orchestra
- Dans la chaleur vacante, cantate radiophonique (1963) for choir and orchestra
- Autres enfantillages (2000) for children's or women's choir with clarinet ad libitum

=== Vocal ===
- Mots (1963) for soprano and ensemble
- Quartet No. 2 (1964) for soprano and string trio
- Liring Ballade (1980) for baritone and orchestra
- Sigrancia-Ballade (1995) for baritone and orchestra
- L'Ascension du Mont Ventoux (2004) for soprano, narrator, flute, clarinet, violin, cello and harp

== Honors ==
- Officier de la Légion d'honneur (2006)
- Prix de l'Académie Charles Cros pour l'ensemble de son œuvre (2015)
- Officier de l'Ordre du Mérite (2003)
- Berlin Prize (2000)
- Commandeur des Arts et des Lettres (1985)
- Prix International Maurice Ravel (1992)
- Grand prix de la SACEM (1982)
- Grand Prix de la Ville de Paris (1981)
- Prix National de la Musique (1974)
- Koussevitzky Prize (1974)
- Copley Foundation award (1954)

== Bibliography ==
- J. Briscoe: "Betsy Jolas: Plupart du Temps II", Contemporary Anthology of Music by Women (Bloomington and Indianapolis, 1997)
- J. Briscoe (2011/2012) "Jolas, Betsy". Grove Dictionary of American Music, 2nd ed. 2012. Oxford Music Online.
- D. Henahan: "Betsy Jolas Winning Recognition in the USA", The New York Times (30 August 1976)
- B. Jolas: Molto espressivo (Paris, 1999) [collected writings]
- V. Perlis: "Recordings in Review: Betsy Jolas", The Yale Review (1995), 179–185
- B. Serrou: "Betsy Jolas. D'un opéra de voyage". Foreword by Henri Dutilleux, Edition Cig'art, 2001.
