= Anna Puigjaner =

Spanish architect

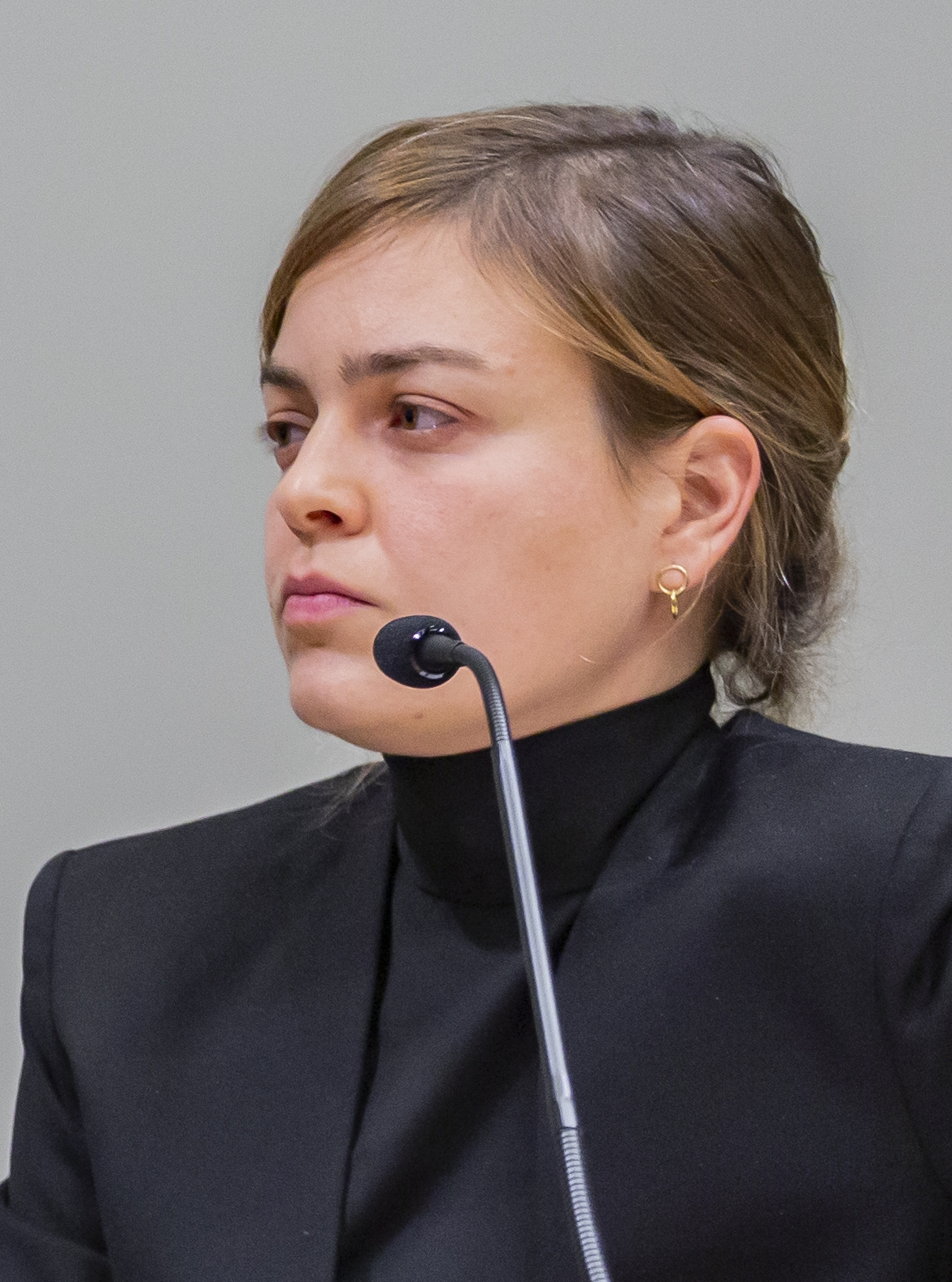
- Born: 1980 (age 45–46); Barcelona, Spain
- Education: Escuela Técnica Superior de Arquitectura de Barcelona
- Occupations: architect, researcher, editor
- Awards: 2016 Wheelwright Prize; 2018 Moira Gemmill Prize for Emerging Architecture, shortlist

Anna Puigjaner Barberà (Barcelona, 1980) is a Spanish architect, researcher and editor. She received the Wheelwright Prize in 2016.

== Biography ==
Puigjaner studied her bachelor, master and doctorate degrees at Escuela Técnica Superior de Arquitectura de Barcelona (ETSAB). Firstly, she graduated in 2004. In 2008, she obtained the Master in Advanced Studies with a research named Waldorf-Royal. In 2014, she completed her PhD with a thesis project focused on the Waldorf Astoria's kitchenless apartments during its first six decades.

In 2005 she cofounded architecture office MAIO alongside María Charneco, Alfredo Lérida and Guillermo López.

Between 2011 and 2016, Piugjaner was an editor of the Catalan magazine Quaderns d’Arquitectura i Urbanisme.

In 2016, she received the Wheelwright Prize with the proposal Kitchenless City: Architectural Systems for Social Welfare, an itinerary that began in Senegal, and moved through Singapur, Tailandia, Mexico, Canada, Japan, China, Sweden and Peru. That same year, her Kitchenless City proposal was finalist of the Rolex Mentor and Protégé Arts Initiative.

In 2018, she and María Charneco were shortlisted for the Moira Gemmill Prize for Emerging Architecture.

In 2023, Piugjaner was appointed as Professor of Architecture and Care at the Department of Architecture at ETH Zurich.

She is currently associate professor of Professional Practice at GSAPP – Columbia University, and has also taught at the Royal College of Art in London and at the Polytechnic University of Catalonia in Barcelona.

Her architectural practice challenges traditional notions of domesticity, particularly the concept of the kitchen, and emphasizes the potential for shared spaces in urban housing.
