= Dan Kiley =

American landscape architect (1912–2004)

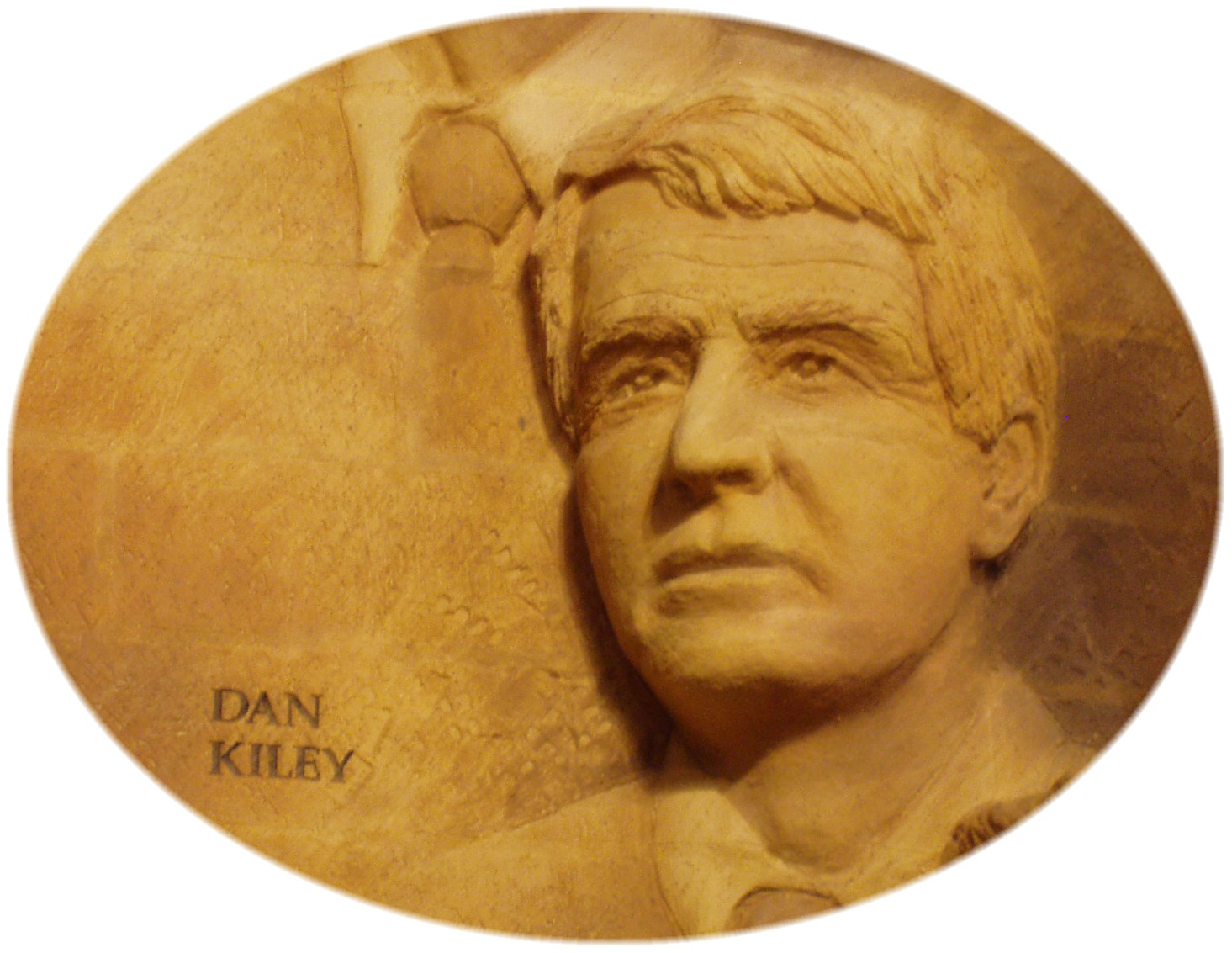
- A sculpture relief of Kiley at the Gateway Arch National Park in St. Louis.
- Born: Daniel Urban Kiley; September 2, 1912; Boston, Massachusetts, United States
- Died: February 21, 2004 (aged 91); Charlotte, Vermont, United States
- Education: Harvard University
- Occupation: Architect
- Spouse: Anne Lothrop Sturges
- Children: 8
- Awards: Thomas Jefferson Medal in Architecture (1987); National Design Awards Lifetime Achievement (2002)
- Projects: Gateway Arch National Park

Daniel Urban Kiley (September 2, 1912 – February 21, 2004) was an American landscape architect who worked in the modern style. Kiley designed over one thousand landscape projects including Gateway Arch National Park in St. Louis.

== Life and career ==
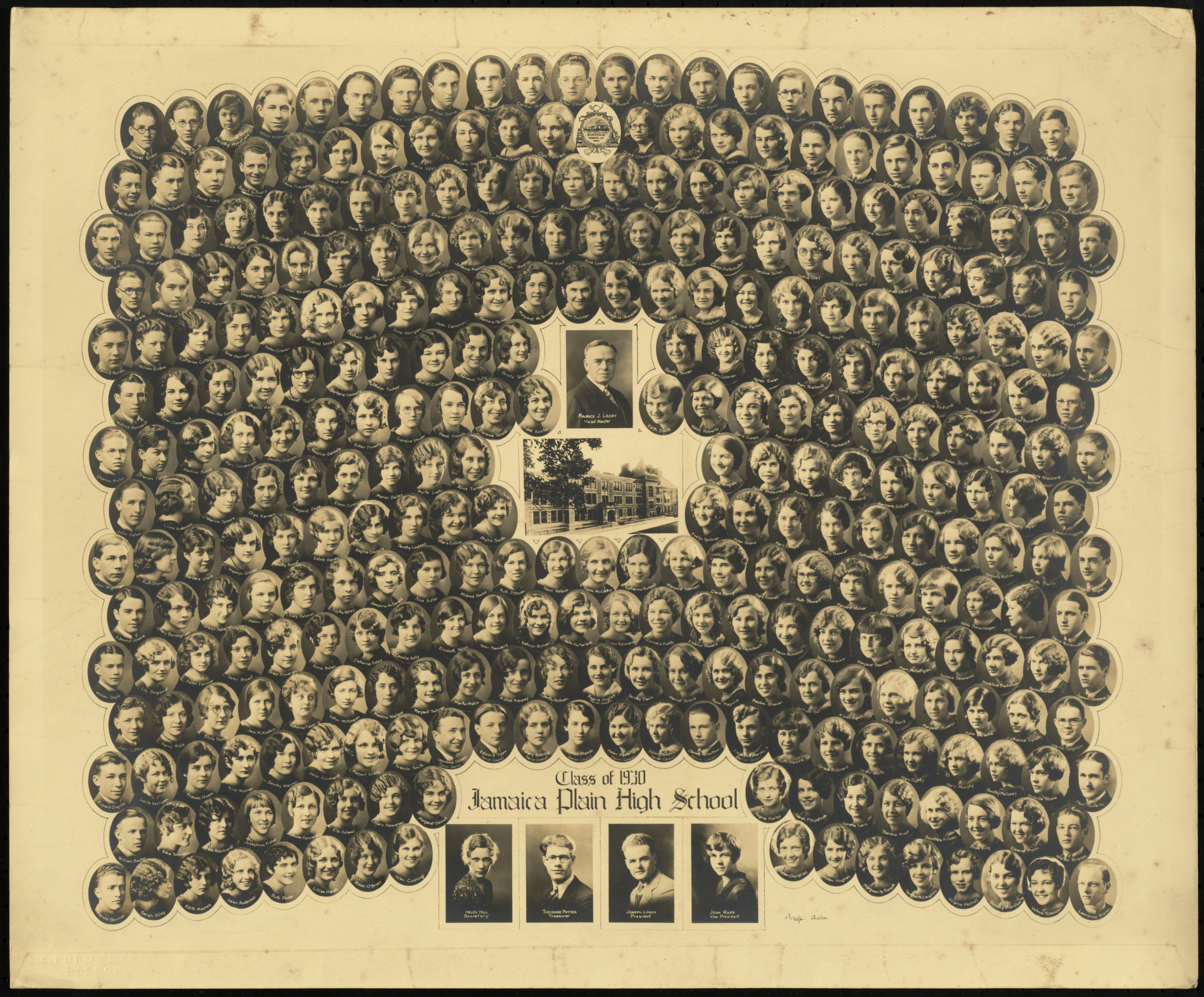
A photograph of the Class of 1930 from Jamaica Plain High School with a portrait of Kiley in the upper left.

Kiley was born in the neighborhood of Roxbury in Boston, where his father was a construction manager. In 1930, Kiley graduated from Jamaica Plain High School. Two years later, he began a four-year apprenticeship with landscape architect Warren H. Manning, working without pay for the first year, during which he learned the fundamentals of the field and developed an interest in the role of plants in design. From 1936 to 1938, Kiley was a special student in the design program at Harvard University, now the Graduate School of Design, while continuing work with Manning. Among his classmates were Garrett Eckbo and James C. Rose, who also became influential landscape architects. After two years, upon Manning's death and the dissolution of his practice, Kiley left Harvard without graduating. He worked briefly for the National Park Service in Concord, New Hampshire, and later the United States Housing Authority, where he met architect Louis Kahn. On Kahn's advice, Kiley left the authority in 1940 to become a licensed practicing architect.

From 1943 to 1945, Kiley served in the United States Army as captain in the Presentation Branch of the Office of Strategic Services, becoming its director after architect Eero Saarinen stepped down. At the end of World War II, Kiley designed the courtroom where the Nuremberg Trials were held. While in Europe, he visited the Château de Villandry and the Palace of Versailles, as well as the work of André Le Nôtre, whose formality and geometric layout shaped his later classical modernist style.

Following the war, Kiley found himself as one of the only modern landscape architects in the postwar building boom. In California, his colleagues Eckbo, Thomas Church, and others were also developing and practicing in the modernist style. Kiley reestablished his practice in Franconia, New Hampshire, and later moved to Charlotte, Vermont. In 1947, in collaboration with Saarinen, Kiley entered and won the competition to design the Gateway Arch National Park (then known as the Jefferson National Expansion Memorial), a high-profile project that launched his career.

Throughout Kiley's practice, he hired such designers as Cheryl Barton, Miho Mazereeuw, Kevin Roche, Harry Turbott, and Peter Walker.

== Legacy ==
In 2000, the actor Paul Hopkins portrayed Kiley in the miniseries Nuremberg, featuring Alec Baldwin.

In 2013, The Cultural Landscape Foundation organized a traveling exhibition titled The Landscape Architecture Legacy of Dan Kiley, which featured over forty newly commissioned photographs of Kiley's projects.

The Harvard University Graduate School of Design has an endowed fellowship in his name: the Daniel Urban Kiley Teaching Fellowship in Landscape Architecture. There is also an endowed lecture series called the Daniel Urban Kiley Lecture, which has been delivered by such designers as Julie Bargmann and James Corner.

== The Kiley Gardens ==
The location of the Kiley Gardens is in the Downtown Tampa area. It is an urban area surrounded by libraries, popular eating places, the University of Tampa, and business headquarters. The gardens were originally a part of the NationsBank Plaza before being built on top of an underground garage. The site has been neglected for many years and is now being supported by the Cultural Landscape Foundation. The foundation is currently trying to restore the gardens to their former glory. Kiley Gardens is currently under reconstruction and partnered with members and residents of Downtown Tampa in an effort to improve its current state. The gardens are accredited by the Tampa Bay Foundation for Architecture and Design. The Kiley Gardens were designed by Dan Kiley with the help of Henry Wolf. The purpose of the gardens was to create some shade in the Downtown Tampa area and more importantly create the feeling of taking a walk in the woods in such an urban setting. The pattern of the garden was set to look like the Fibonacci mathematical sequence. The sequence is meant to start with the numbers zero and one and each number after that is the sum of the two previous numbers added together. When the gardens first opened in 1988 the goal was to have many more trees covering the area, five individual islands with a tree in the middle of each island, and plants such as palm allées and crepe myrtles. The garden was also supposed to have water features, such as basins and a water garden, and a view of the Hillsborough River and the University of Tampa. The original design for the garden was never completed and later it created many structural issues with the underground parking garage leading to the garden being torn down. Before it was completely destroyed the garden was saved by the City of Tampa and partnerships between local businesses and community members who wanted to preserve the legacy Dan Kiley left behind. The gardens were meant to represent a connection to nature in an ever growing urban area.

== Style ==
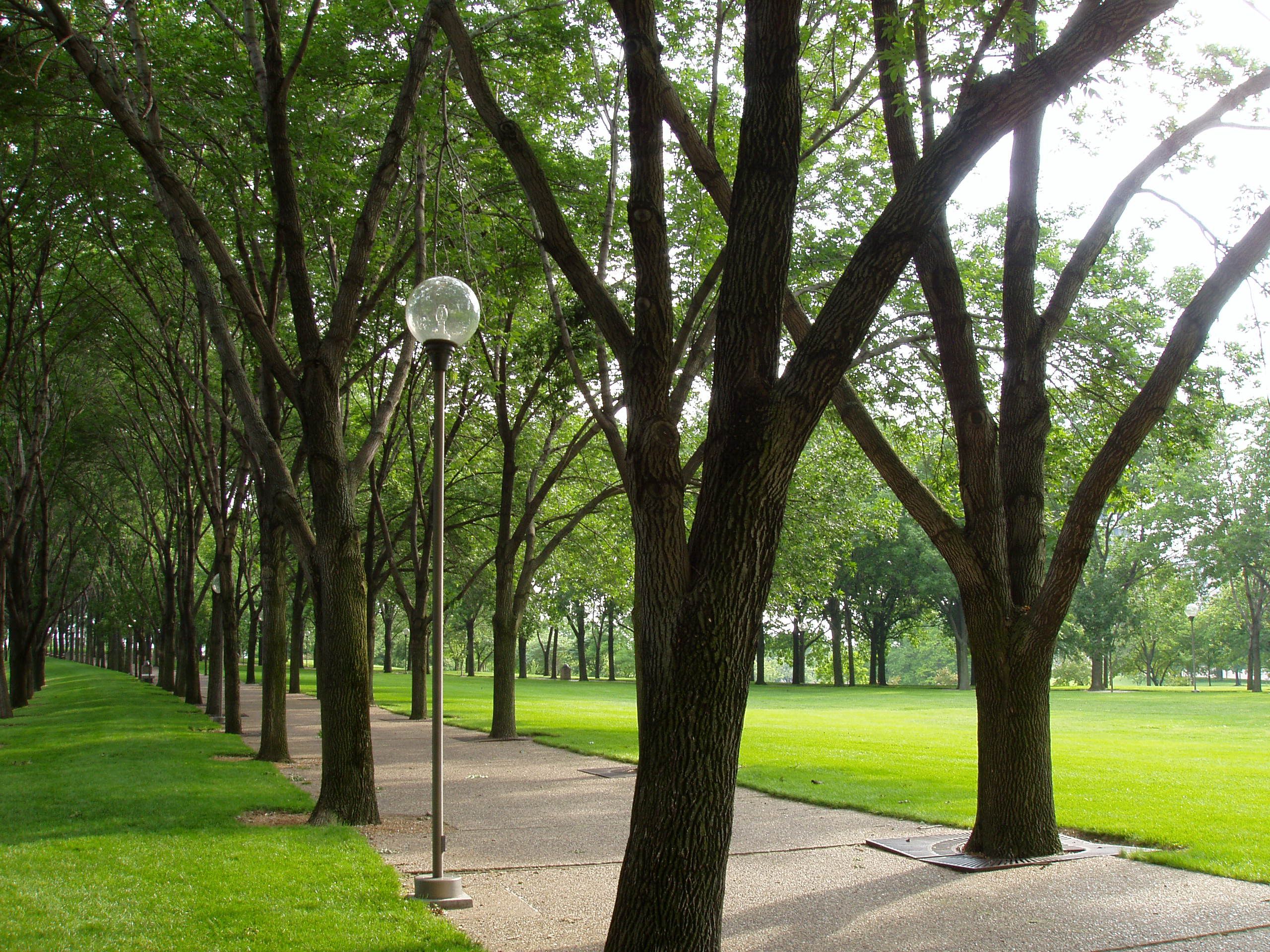
Gateway Arch National Park in St. Louis.

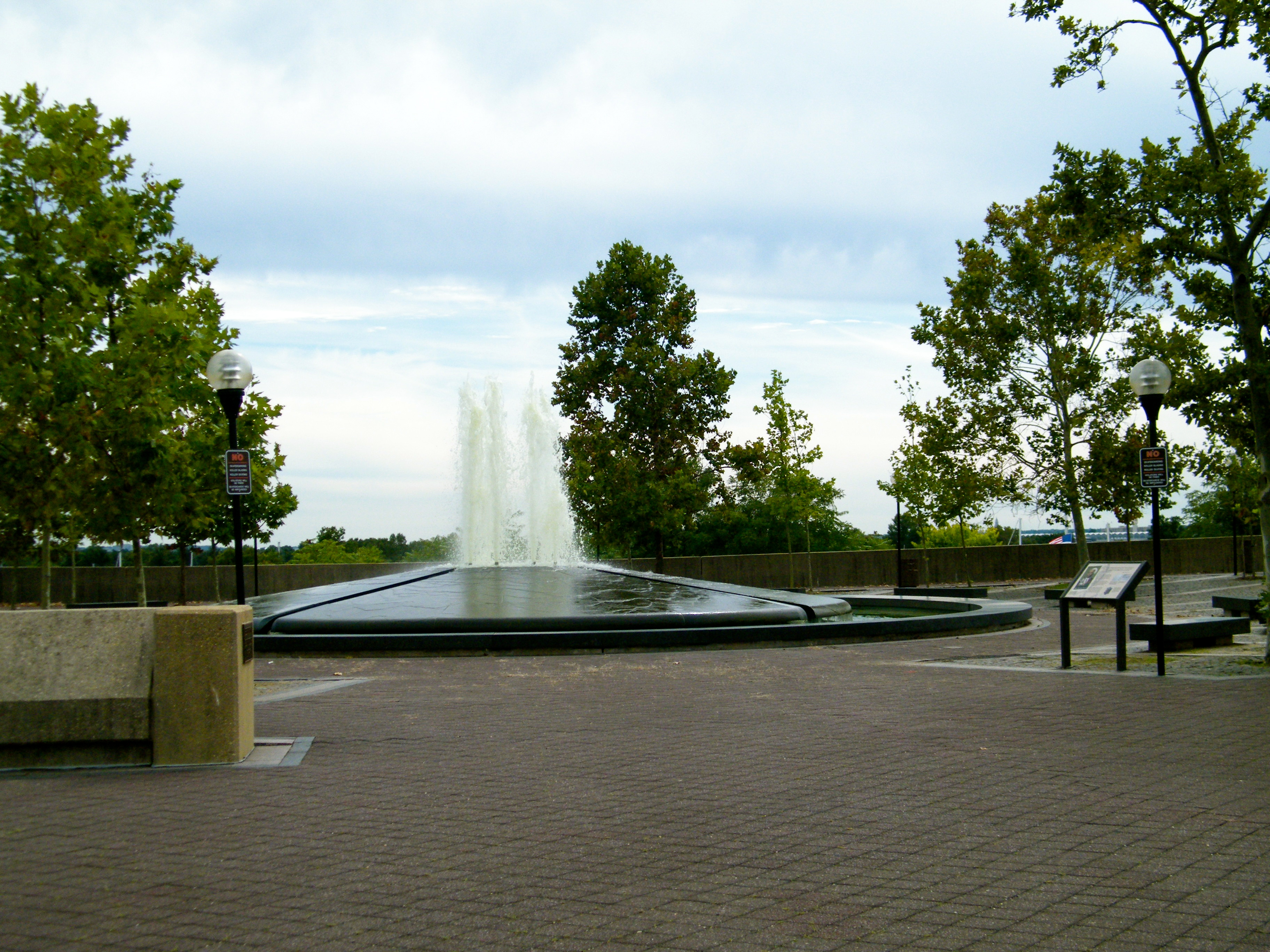
Benjamin Banneker Park in Washington, DC.

The geometric layout of allees, bosques, water, paths, orchards, lawns, and other landscape features characterize Kiley's style. To him, regular geometry was at the heart of his design. Like his predecessors, Le Corbusier and Le Nôtre, Kiley believed that geometry was an inherent to humans. It was the structure one could use to gain comprehension and create stabilization of surroundings. Kiley also believed that humans were a part of nature, rather than being separate from it. Rather than imitating curvilinear forms in nature, he asserted mathematical order onto landscape. His designs overstepped their boundaries rather than ending elements neatly on a suggested edge. Kiley called this approach, slippage, or an extension beyond the implied boundary, creating ambiguous relationships in the landscape.

== Awards ==
- National Academy of Design Election (1963)
- Thomas Jefferson Medal in Architecture (1987)
- American Academy of Arts and Letters Election (1996)
- National Medal of Arts Lifetime Honors (1997)
- National Design Awards Lifetime Achievement (2002)

== Selected projects ==
- Irwin Conference Center, Columbus (1954)
- United States Air Force Academy, Cadet Area, Colorado Springs (1954)
- Miller House and Garden, Columbus (1955)
- Seymour Krieger House, Bethesda (1958)
- Independence Mall, Philadelphia (1963)
- Gateway Arch National Park, St. Louis (1965)
- Milton Lee Olive Park, Chicago(1965)
- Art Institute of Chicago Building, Chicago (1965)
- Ford Foundation Building, New York City (1967)
- Jardine Water Purification Plant, Chicago (1968)
- Oakland Museum of California, Oakland (1969)
- Benjamin Banneker Park, Arlington (1970)
- Constitution Gardens, Washington, DC (1976)
- Cathedral of the Immaculate Conception, Burlington (1977)
- NationsBank Plaza, Tampa (1985)
- Fountain Place, Dallas (1986)
- Pittsburgh Cultural Trust Plaza, Pittsburgh (1999)

== See also ==
- List of Harvard University non-graduate alumni
- List of members of the American Academy of Arts and Letters Department of Art
- List of landscape architects
- List of people from Vermont
