= William Henry Bishop =

American novelist

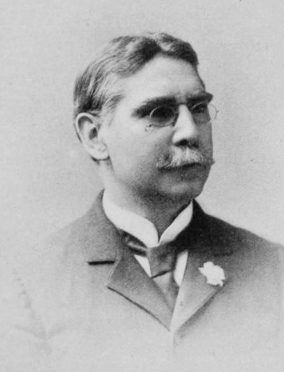
- Born: January 7, 1847; Hartford, Connecticut, US
- Died: September 26, 1928 (aged 81); Brooklyn, Connecticut, US
- Burial place: Old Cemetery, East Haven
- Education: Yale University
- Occupation: Novelist
- Spouse: Mary Dearborn Jackson (m. 1886)
- Children: 2

William Henry Bishop (January 7, 1847 – September 26, 1928) was an American novelist.

== Biography ==
William Henry Bishop was born in Hartford, Connecticut, on January 7, 1847. He graduated from Yale University in 1867, where he later went on to teach.

He married Mary Dearborn Jackson on July 28, 1886, and they had two children.

He became a member of the American Academy of Arts and Letters Department of Literature in 1918.

He died in Brooklyn, Connecticut, on September 26, 1928, and was buried at the Old Cemetery in East Haven.

== Works ==
The best-known of his novels and sketches are: Detmold (1879); The House of a Merchant Prince (1882); Choy Susan and Other Stories (1884); Fish and Men in the Maine Islands (1885); The Golden Justice (1887); The Brownstone Boy and Other Queer People (1888); A House Hunter in Europe (1893); Writing to Rosina (1894). Old Mexico and Her Lost Provinces (1883) is a book of travel.
