= Cheryl Barton =

American landscape architect

- Born: Erie, Pennsylvania
- Education: Bucknell University, Harvard Graduate School of Design
- Occupation: Landscape Architect
- Awards: Rome Prize in Landscape Architecture 2004
- Website: toocb.com

Cheryl Barton is an American landscape architect and founding principal of the San Francisco-based Office of Cheryl Barton. A Fellow and Past President of the American Society of Landscape Architects, she has national and international projects in the US, Europe, Singapore, Abu Dhabi, and Bolivia. Her work includes national and local public parks, urban open spaces and master plans, cultural landscapes, college and institutional campuses, public art installations, corporate landscapes, and ecological master plans. Barton has received an Individual Fellowship from the National Endowment for the Arts and the Rome Prize in Landscape Architecture from the American Academy in Rome. She was featured in the 2012 documentary, Women in the Dirt.

== Early life and training ==
Cheryl Barton grew up in Erie, Pennsylvania. She received a bachelor's degree from Bucknell University in Fine Arts and Geology, and studied architecture and photography at the Boston Architectural Center. She received a master's degree in Landscape Architecture from the Harvard Graduate School of Design.

== Career ==
One of Barton's early jobs was in the office of modernist landscape architect Dan Kiley, whom she cites as influential in the development of her design philosophy and use of landscape intervention to heighten environmental awareness. Later positions Barton filled included Director of Landscape Architecture at Gresham Smith & Partners in Nashville, TN, from 1980 to 1985, and Principal and Design Studio Director of EDAW in San Francisco (now owned by AECOM) from 1986 to 1993.

In 1994 Barton founded her own firm, Office of Cheryl Barton in San Francisco, CA. Some of the firm's more well-known projects include landscapes at the Stanford Law School, The Gap Headquarters in San Francisco, the Rosie the Riveter Memorial, and Cavallo Point, a renovation of Fort Baker in Marin County, CA. The firm has increasingly become known for its focus on green infrastructure and landscape urbanism. In its Cavallo Point project, for example, the firm employed a nontraditional approach to planting design through harvesting seeds from the site which were then propagated in a local nursery, and planted as part of a landscape restoration plan.

Barton has often collaborated with artists including Elyn Zimmerman, Susan Schwartzenberg, Claes Oldenburg and Coosje Van Bruggen, Bruce Beasley, and Mark Mennin.

Barton has been involved in professional and civic organizations and initiatives focused on green urbanism. She is a fellow of the American Society of Landscape Architects (ASLA) and served as the Society's president from 1987 to 1988. She has taught Sustainable Site Planning and Landscape Design workshops at the Pacific Energy Center in San Francisco. In 2003, Barton served on the design jury for the Rose Kennedy Greenway competition in Boston, MA. Barton also serves on the Design Review Board of the San Francisco Bay Conservation and Development Commission.

Barton has been invited to speak nationally on her landscape architectural practice, with lectures at the Nevada Museum of Art and the NASA Research Park, as well as a wide range of academic institutions, including Stanford University, Pennsylvania State University, the University of San Francisco, and the University of Oregon.

== Style and themes ==
Barton cites witnessing the devastation of Lake Erie as a young child as influential in her decision to pursue landscape architecture. While on a Charles Eliot Traveling Fellowship from Harvard University, Barton visited Temple of the Sun in Incayllacta, Bolivia; there she realized that the landscape "is a powerful medium of expression, a medium that can transform place and bridge cultures, and in so doing it can transform human values." Barton also discusses the influence of the gardens of 17th century French landscape architect André Le Nôtre, of which she says: 'To see something deliberate and controlled juxtaposed with the unmanicured enhances the perception—and, I think, the appreciation or "seeing" of each. That is an experience I use constantly in my work: strong juxtapositions of the "natural" with "cultural interventions," which make people see, appreciate and, hopefully, care for their environments.'

Barton develops her philosophy of the integration of design and ecology and "landscape urbanism" further in a Boston Globe op-ed published in 2003 while she was a juror for the Rose Kennedy Greenway design competition: "Parks can be instrumental in solving larger urban and ecological or infrastructure problems, such as storm drainage, air quality, water supply, and the demolition (or construction) of expressways. If grounded in a regional ecology, parks can simultaneously accomplish social and environmental goals… Parks are expected to be much more than they have been at any time in the past. They are layered in meaning and richly stratified in function—something more than that experienced only through our eyes. They are powerful vehicles for reconnecting us to the land and to each other, and for enriching our very urban existence."

In an interview with the Landscape Architecture Foundation, Barton outlines two intentions driving her recent work: a campaign Barton calls "Dirt is the New Water," which focuses on the "critical interrelationship between the soil and water that support the visible landscape"; and a concept for the long-term management of a site that Barton has called "Site Commissioning."

== Awards and recognition ==
Cheryl Barton and her firm have received numerous awards for their projects. In 1983, Barton received an Individual Fellowship from the National Endowment for the Arts to study design restoration of derelict landscape. Barton is a Fellow if the American Academy in Rome, having been awarded the Rome Prize in Landscape Architecture in 2003. She was featured in the 2012 documentary, Women in the Dirt, along with 6 other prominent women landscape architects.
