= Wheelwright Prize =

International architecture traveling fellowship

- Current: Ellen Peirson
- Awarded for: Talented early-career architects worldwide proposing exceptional itineraries for research and discovery.
- Sponsored by: Harvard Graduate School of Design
- Country: United States
- Presented by: Harvard Graduate School of Design
- Reward: US$100,000
- First award: 1936; 90 years ago
- Website: www.wheelwrightprize.org

The Wheelwright Architecture Prize (formerly known as the Arthur C. Wheelwright Traveling Fellowship) is an international architecture traveling fellowship presented annually to "talented early-career architects worldwide proposing exceptional itineraries for research and discovery." Founded in 1935 by the Harvard Graduate School of Design, the prize is entirely funded by the same institution.

== History ==
The Wheelwright Prize was established in 1935 as the «Arthur C. Wheelwright Traveling Fellowship», and was originally open only to alumni of the Harvard Graduate School of Design.

Arthur C. Wheelwright graduated from Harvard College in the class of 1887. After graduation, he spent a year working in his father's cotton commission house in Boston. However, Wheelwright then pursued a two-year study of architecture in Boston, as Harvard did not yet offer architecture courses. He went on to study art in Paris for three years, faced a period of illness, and ultimately settled into the life of a farmer and part-time artist in Westwood, Massachusetts. Three years after his death in 1932, his widow, Edith F. Wheelwright, honored his life by establishing a fellowship for "travel and study outside the United States."

The core idea of the prize was to provide a Grand Tour experience to graduates at a time when international travel was uncommon.

In 2013, the grant was renamed and reformatted to become an international competition for early-career architects who have graduated from an professionally accredited architectural program within the last 15 years.

== Eligibility ==
The Wheelwright Prize is open to early-career architects based anywhere in the world who have graduated from a professionally accredited architecture degree program in the past 15 years. The fellowship must be granted to individual entrants, and those winners based in the United States, their research must be partially undertaken outside the country.

The recipient receives US$100,000 for travel and research-related expenses, which are expected to be spent throughout two years from its announcement. Along with the money, the recipient is invited to lecture at the school and given the opportunity to appear in a research publication of the same institution.

The 2024 jury cycle comprised Noura Alsayeh, Mira Henry, Mark Lee, Jacob Riedel, Enrique Walker, and Harvard GSD dean Sarah M. Whiting. Two years later, the jury comprised Whiting again, alongside Mariana Ibañez, Marina Otero, and Charles Waldheim.

== Laureates ==
Since 2013, non-GSD alumni have been allowed to apply, provided they graduated from a professionally accredited architectural program within the last 15 years. The 1968-1969 laureate, Adèle Naudé Santos, is the first female prize winner.

=== 1936-1940 ===
- 1936-1937: Newton Ellis Griffith, Paul Marvin Rudolph, Walter Egan Trevett, R. Prentice Bradley
- 1937-1938: Constantine A. Pertzoff
- 1938-1939: Walter H.Kilham Jr.
- 1939-1940: Eliot Fette Noyes

=== 1940-1949 ===
- 1940-1941: Leonard James Currie
- 1941-1942: Phillip Emile Joseph
- 1942-1943: Albert Evans Simonson, William W. Wurster
- 1943-1944: Christopher Tunnard
- 1944-1945: Robert William Blachnik, Alvaro Ortega, Theodore Jan Prichard, Helge Westermann
- 1945-1946: William Lindus Cody Wheaton, Kurt Augustus Mumm, Ira Rakatansky, Stanley Salzman
- 1946-1947: Jean Paul Carlhian, Noel Buckland Dant, Martin Daniel Meyerson
- 1947-1948: Joseph Douglas Carroll Jr.
- 1948-1949: Vaughn Papworth Call

=== 1950-1959 ===
- 1949-1950: Henry Louis Horowitz, Jean Claude Mazet, Edward Chase Weren, George Elliot Rafferty
- 1950-1951: I. M. Pei, Jacek von Henneberg, Jerry Neal Leibman
- 1951-1952: Frederick D. Holister, Donald Emanuel Olsen
- 1952-1953: William J. Conklin, Gottfied Paul Csala, Helmut Jacoby, and Edward Stutt
- 1953-1954: Royal Alfred McClure
- 1954-1955: Ferdinand Frederick Bruck
- 1955-1956: Dolf Hermann Schnebli
- 1956-1957: George F. Conley
- 1957-1958: Don Hisaka
- 1958-1959: Paul Mitarachi
- 1959-1960: John C. Haro

=== 1960-1969 ===
- 1960-1961: Donald Craig Freeman
- 1961-1962: Albert Szabo
- 1962-1963: B. Frank Schlesinger
- 1963-1964: Paul Krueger
- 1964-1965: William Morgan
- 1965-1966: Peter Woytok
- 1966-1967: William Lindemulder
- 1967-1968: William H. Liskamm
- 1968-1969: Adèle Naudé Santos
- 1969-1970: Robert Kramer

=== 1970-1979 ===
- 1970-1971: Theodore Liebman
- 1971-1972: Minoru Takeyama
- 1972-1973: Ozdemir Erginsav
- 1973-1974: Klaus Herdeg
- 1974-1975: Alan Chimacoff
- 1976-1977: Corky Poster and Leon J. Goldberg
- 1978-1979: Nelson K. Chen and Susie Kim
- 1979-1980: Nelson K. Chen

=== 1981-1989 ===
- 1981-1982: Hector R. Arce
- 1982-1983: Joanna Lombard
- 1985-1986: Paul John Grayson
- 1986-1987: Christopher Doyle and Frances Hsu
- 1987-1988: Linda Pollak
- 1988-1989: Elizabeth A. Williams
- 1989-1990: Wellington Reiter

=== 1990-1999 ===
- 1990-1991: Holly Getch
- 1991-1992: Roger Sherman
- 1992-1993: Jeffrey A. Murphy
- 1993-1994: Richard M. Sommer
- 1994-1995: Edwin Y. Chan
- 1995-1996: Raveervarn Choksombatchai
- 1996-1997: James Favaro
- 1998-1999: Nana Last
- 1999-2000: Paolo Bercah

=== 2000-2009 ===
- 2000-2001: Farès el-Dahdah
- 2001-2002: Sze Tsung Leong
- 2002-2003: Jeannie Kim
- 2003-2004: Ker-Shing Ong
- 2004-2005: Cecilia Tham
- 2005-2006: Joshua Comaroff
- 2006-2007: Miho Mazereeuw
- 2007-2008: Carlos Arnaiz
- 2008-2009: Mason White
- 2009-2010: Ying Zhou

=== 2010-2019 ===
- 2010-2011: Elisa Silva
- 2013: Gia Wolff
- 2014: Jose M. Ahedo
- 2015: Erik L'Heureux
- 2016: Anna Puigjaner
- 2017: Samuel Bravo
- 2018: Aude-Line Dulière
- 2019: Aleksandra Jaeschke

=== 2020-present ===
- 2020: Daniel Fernández Pascual
- 2021: Germane Barnes
- 2022: Marina Otero
- 2023: Jingru (Cyan) Cheng
- 2024: Thandi Loewenson
- 2025: Mauro Marinelli
- 2026: Ellen Peirson
