= Adèle Naudé Santos =

South African-born American architect

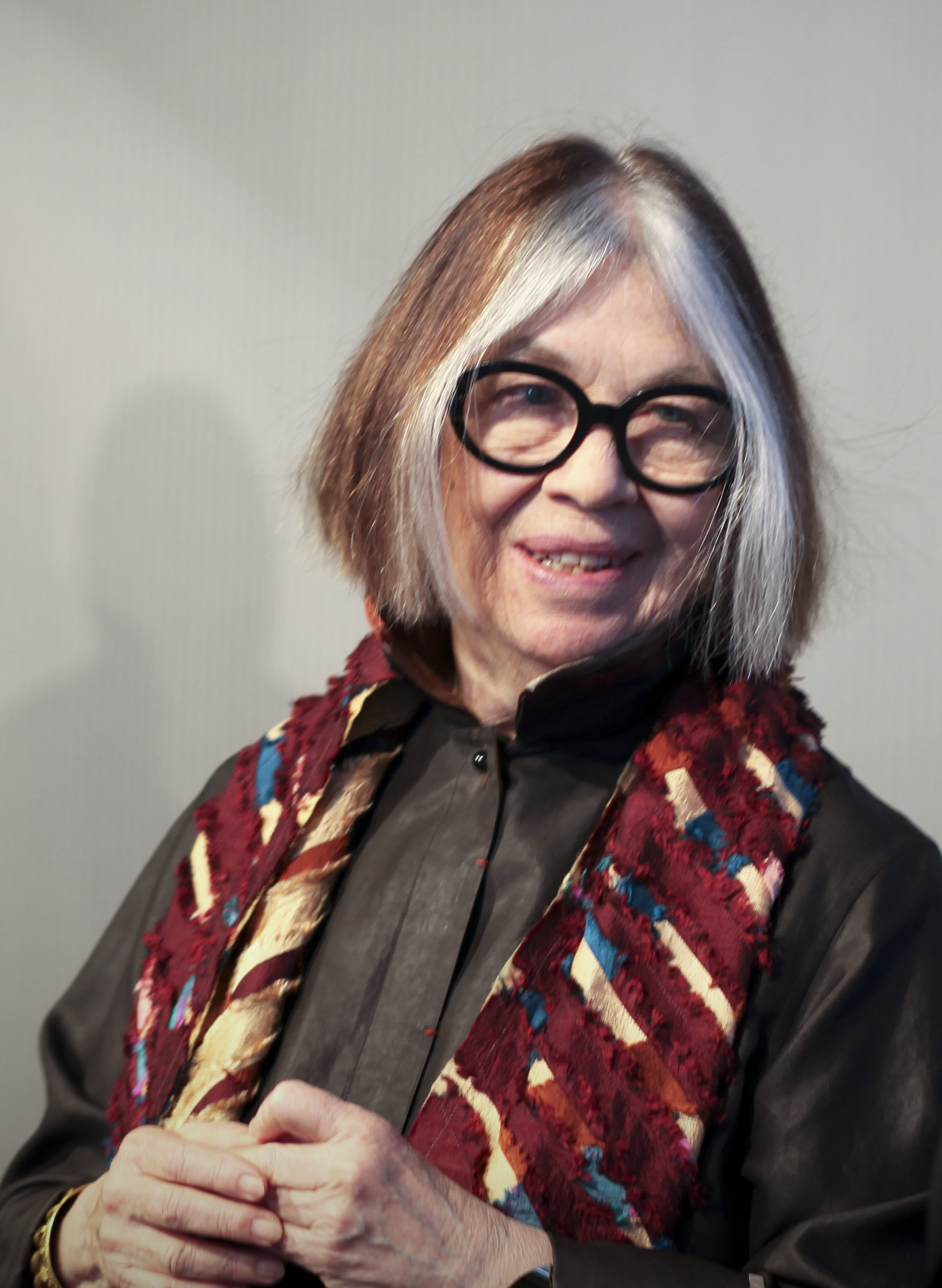
- Santos in 2010
- Born: South Africa
- Education: Architectural Association; Harvard University; University of Pennsylvania
- Occupation: Architect
- Awards: 2009 AIA/ACSA Topaz Medallion for Excellence in Architectural Education
- Projects: Institute of Contemporary Art, Philadelphia

Adèle Naudé Santos is a South African-born American architect and urban designer focused on low-income housing, campus architecture, and socially conscious design. She is the principal architect of Santos Prescott and Associates, based in San Francisco and Somerville, Massachusetts. She served as the Dean of the School of Architecture and Planning at Massachusetts Institute of Technology from 2003 to 2014. She became a Fellow of the American Institute of Architects in 1996.

== Early life ==
Born in South Africa, Santos holds an architectural degree from the University of Cape Town and the Architectural Association in London, a Masters of Architecture in Urban Design from Harvard Graduate School of Design, and a Masters of City Planning from the University of Pennsylvania. Some of her early work included being part of the design team who worked on Euston Station in London and work on a low-income housing project in Paris. She served as a project architect in Montreal for Expo 67.

== Academic career ==
Her academic career includes positions at MIT School of Architecture and Planning, Harvard Graduate School of Design, Rice University, University of California Berkeley, and the University of Pennsylvania. She was the founding Dean of the new School of Architecture at the University of California San Diego.

In 2013, Santos was instrumental in creating a partnership between the Center for Advanced Urbanism at MIT and the American Institute of Architects Decade of Design initiative to link design and public health through research initiatives.

== Notable projects ==
- Institute of Contemporary Art, Philadelphia
- Center for the Arts at Albright College, Reading, Pennsylvania
- Children's Creativity Museum, formerly named Yerba Buena Gardens Children's Center in San Francisco
- City Links, A Vision Plan for San Diego
- Franklin/LaBrea Affordable Housing in Hollywood, California

== Awards ==
- Wheelwright Prize 1968-1969 by the Harvard Graduate School of Design.
- Topaz Medallion for Excellence in Architectural Education from the American Institute of Architects and Association of Collegiate Schools of Architecture (2009)
- Terner Prize for Innovation and Leadership in Affordable HOusing, Finalist Mission Creek Senior Community (2007)
- Boston Society of Architects John M. Clancy Award for the Design of Socially Responsible Housing, Mission Creek Senior Community (2007)
- American Academy of Rome Prize (2002)
- 10th Sophia Gray Memorial Lecture Laureate (1998)
