= Institute of Contemporary Art, Philadelphia =

Art museum

Institute of Contemporary Art

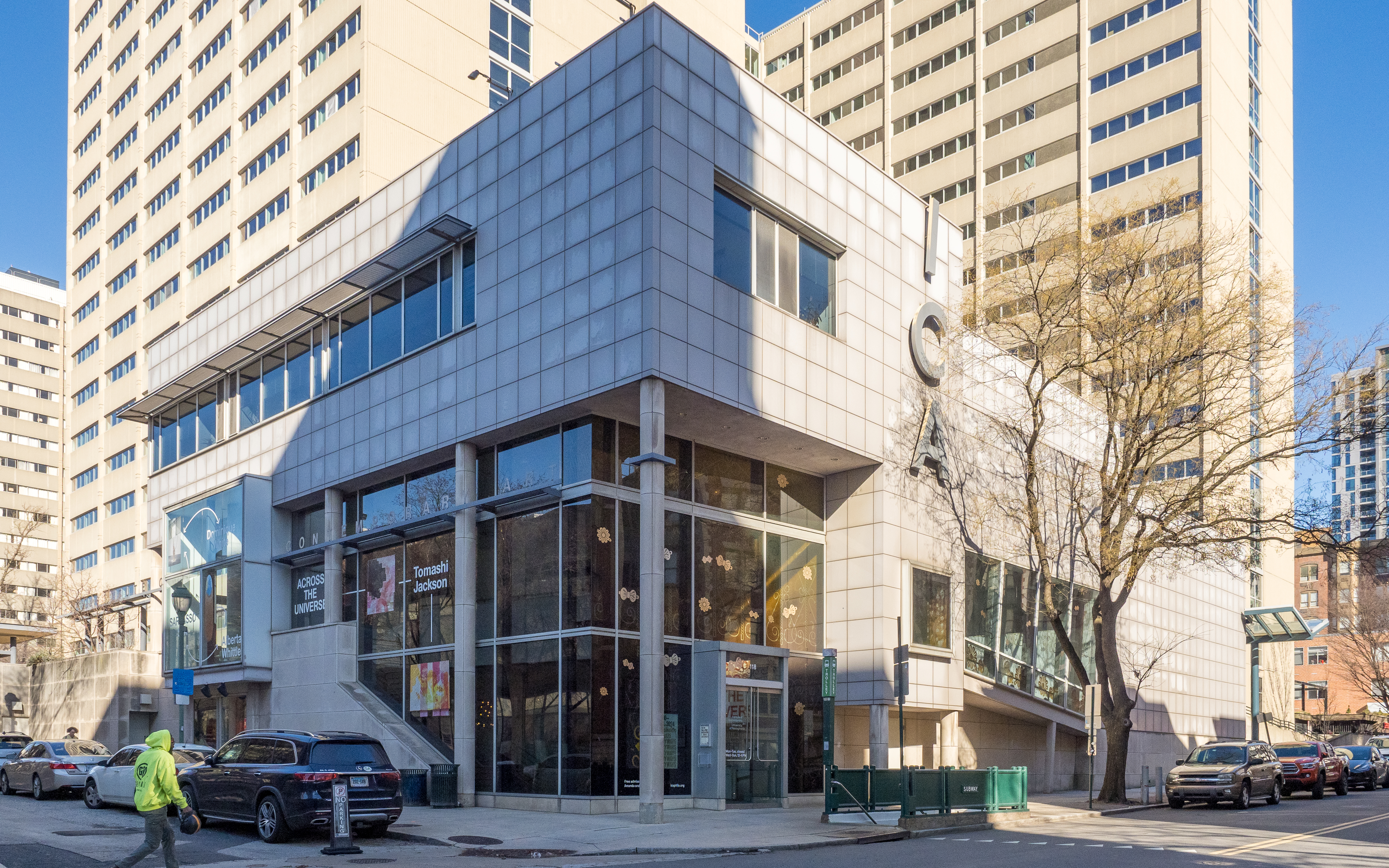
- The Institute of Contemporary Art in Philadelphia (2024)
- Established: 1963
- Location: 118 South 36th Street; Philadelphia, Pennsylvania
- Coordinates: 39.9542°N 75.1948°W
- Director: Johanna Burton
- Architect: Adèle Naudé Santos
- Owner: University of Pennsylvania
- Public transit access: 36th Street: T
- Website: icaphila.org

The Institute of Contemporary Art or ICA is a contemporary art museum in Philadelphia. The museum is associated with the University of Pennsylvania, and is located on its campus. The Institute is one of the country's leading museums dedicated to exhibiting the innovative art of our time. Robert Chaney is its director of curatorial affairs.

== History ==
Since its founding in 1963 by Holmes Perkins, the ICA has established a reputation for identifying artists of promise who later emerge in the international spotlight. The ICA has exhibited the first museum shows of Andy Warhol, Laurie Anderson, Agnes Martin, and Robert Indiana. The ICA does not have a permanent collection, but new exhibits are shown three times a year, with approximately twelve shows annually. ICA offers educational programs, artist talks, lectures, films and tours.

Early shows included works by Richard Artschwager, Vija Celmins, Karen Kilimnik, Charles LeDray, Barry Le Va, Glenn Ligon, Robert Mapplethorpe, Pepon Osorio, Tavares Strachan, and Cy Twombly. Other featured artists have included Gillian Wearing, Yoshitomo Nara, John Armleder, Robert Crumb, Kate Gilmore, and Odili Donald Odita.

Roberta Smith of the New York Times wrote in 2007 that the ICA is "among the most adventuresome showcases in the country where art since 1970 is concerned. It chooses its subject well, keeps things accessible through the judicious use of well-written labels and brochures, and takes risks that prove that the curatorial discipline is alive and kicking". In 2009, Smith also observed, "On a surprisingly regular basis, the tiny Institute of Contemporary Art at the University of Pennsylvania here mounts exhibitions that make the contemporary-art adventures of many larger museums look blinkered, timid and hidebound."

The ICA was previously headquartered in Meyerson Hall. The current modern gallery building was built in 1990 and designed by Adèle Naudé Santos, who was an architecture professor at Penn at the time and later became the dean of architecture and planning at MIT.
