= List of members of the American Academy of Arts and Letters Department of Music =

The music section of the American Academy of Arts and Letters is one of the society's three departments. After being nominated by current members, new members are selected in two elections, the first by the department they join (Art, Literature or Music). Candidates who receive the most votes in their own department are then voted on by the entire membership.

== Current members ==
Name	Elected
John Adams	1997
John Luther Adams	2022
Samuel Adler	2001
T.J. Anderson	2005
Robert Beaser	2004
William Bolcom	1993
Martin Bresnick	2006
Chen Yi	2019
John Corigliano	1991
Sebastian Currier	2016
Anthony Davis	2021
Philip Glass	2003
Adolphus Hailstork	2023
John Harbison	1992
Stephen Hartke	2009
Jennifer Higdon	2022
Stephen Jaffe	2012
Betsy Jolas	1983
Aaron Jay Kernis	2011
David Lang	2014
Paul Lansky	2016
Tania León	2010
Fred Lerdahl	2010
George E. Lewis	2018
Annea Lockwood	2022
Wynton Marsalis	2021
Meredith Monk	2019
Carman Moore	2023
Tobias Picker	2012
David Rakowski	2016
Shulamit Ran	2003
Bernard Rands	2004
Steve Reich	1994
Roger Reynolds	2023
Terry Riley	2020
David Sanford	2022
Maria Schneider	2023
Joseph Schwantner	2002
Roberto Sierra	2021
Alvin Singleton	2014
Wadada Leo Smith	2023
Christopher Theofanidis	2022
Augusta Read Thomas	2009
Henry Threadgill	2021
Joan Tower	1998
Chinary Ung	2020
Melinda Wagner	2017
Julia Wolfe	2017
Yehudi Wyner	1999
Pamela Z	2023
Ellen Taaffe Zwilich	1992

== Deceased members ==
Name	Life	Elected
Dominick Argento	1927–2019	1980
Arthur H. Bird	1856–1923	1898
Martin Boykan	1931–2021	2011
Howard Brockway	1870–1951	1910
Dudley Buck	1839–1909	1898
George Whitefield Chadwick	1854–1931	1898
Chou Wen-chung	1923–2019	1982
Frederick Converse	1871–1940	1908
George Crumb	1929–2022	1975
Walter Damrosch	1862–1950	1898
Mario Davidovsky	1934–2019	1982
Reginald De Koven	1859–1920	1898
David Del Tredici	1937–2023	1984
Carlisle Floyd	1926–2021	2001
Arthur Foote	1853–1937	1898
William W. Gilchrist	1846–1916	1898
Henry Kimball Hadley	1871–1937	1908
Victor Herbert	1859–1924	1908
Karel Husa	1921–2016	1994
Ben Johnston	1926–2019	2018
Charles Martin Loeffler	1861–1935	1908
Edward MacDowell	1860–1908	1898
Ethelbert Nevin	1862–1901	1898
John Knowles Paine	1839–1906	1898
Horatio Parker	1863–1919	1898
Ned Rorem	1923–2022	1979
Christopher Rouse	1949–2019	2002
Frederic Rzewski	1938–2021	2009
Harry Rowe Shelley	1858–1947	1898
David Stanley Smith	1877–1949	1910
Stephen Sondheim	1930–2021	1983
Edgar Stillman Kelley	1857–1944	1898
Frank Van der Stucken	1858–1929	1898
Arthur Batelle Whiting	1861–1936	1905
Charles Wuorinen	1938–2020	1985

== See also ==
- Department of Art members
- Department of Literature members
