= List of members of the American Academy of Arts and Letters Department of Literature =

This List of members of the American Academy of Arts and Letters Department of Literature shows the members of one of the three departments of the American Academy of Arts and Letters.

After being nominated by current members, new members are selected in two elections, the first by the department they join (Art, Literature or Music). Candidates who receive the most votes in their own department are then voted on by the entire membership.

== Current members ==
Name	Elected
Renata Adler	1987
Elizabeth Alexander	2025
Sherman Alexie	2015
Isabel Allende	2004
Hilton Als	2021
Kwame Anthony Appiah	2008
Charles Baxter	2024
Ann Beattie	1992
Louis Begley	2011
Wendell Berry	2014
Frank Bidart	2006
T. Coraghessan Boyle	2009
Peter Carey	2016
Robert A. Caro	2008
Michael Chabon	2012
Ron Chernow	2018
Ta-Nehisi Coates	2021
Henri Cole	2017
Billy Collins	2016
Michael Cunningham	2011
Edwidge Danticat	2020
Lydia Davis	2022
Don DeLillo	1989
Junot Diaz	2017
Annie Dillard	1999
Rita Dove	2011
Dave Eggers	2015
Deborah Eisenberg	2007
Louise Erdrich	1998
Jeffrey Eugenides	2018
Percival Everett	2023
Richard Ford	1998
Jonathan Franzen	2012
Ian Frazier	2019
Mary Gaitskill	2020
Henry Louis Gates Jr.	1999
Adam Gopnik	2025
Mary Gordon	2007
Vivian Gornick	2023
Jorie Graham	2009
Stephen Greenblatt	2008
John Guare	1989
Allan Gurganus	2007
Joy Harjo	2021
Robert Hass	2002
Terrance Hayes	2022
Amy Hempel	2017
Edward Hirsch	2017
Edward Hoagland	1982
Margo Jefferson	2024
Gish Jen	2025
Maxine Hong Kingston	2018
John Irving	2001
Ha Jin	2014
Diane Johnson	1999
Edward P. Jones	2019
Garrison Keillor	2001
William Kennedy	1993
Jamaica Kincaid	2004
Barbara Kingsolver	2021
Elizabeth Kolbert	2021
Yusef Komunyakaa	2009
Jane Kramer	2016
Tony Kushner	2005
Jhumpa Lahiri	2012
Chang-rae Lee	2025
Yiyun Li	2023
Phillip Lopate	2023
David Mamet	1994
Colum McCann	2017
Alice McDermott	2024
Thomas McGuane	2010
John McPhee	1988
Daniel Mendelsohn	2025
Claire Messud	2025
Lorrie Moore	2006
Paul Muldoon	2008
Lynn Nottage	2018
Sigrid Nunez	2021
Joyce Carol Oates	1978
Tim O'Brien	2022
Sharon Olds	2015
Cynthia Ozick	1988
Suzan-Lori Parks	2019
Ann Patchett	2017
Caryl Phillips	2021
Jayne Anne Phillips	2018
Darryl Pinckney	2025
Robert Pinsky	1999
Richard Powers	2010
Richard Price	2009
Francine Prose	2010
Annie Proulx	2007
Claudia Rankine	2019
David Remnick	2016
Marilynne Robinson	2010
Kay Ryan	2017
George Saunders	2018
Stacy Schiff	2019
Grace Schulman	2019
David Sedaris	2019
Wallace Shawn	2006
Leslie Marmon Silko	2021
Mona Simpson	2020
Jane Smiley	2001
Anna Deavere Smith	2023
Tracy K. Smith	2021
Gary Snyder	1987
Art Spiegelman	2015
Elizabeth Strout	2022
Amy Tan	2022
Paul Theroux	1984
Natasha Trethewey	2019
Calvin Trillin	2008
Anne Tyler	1983
Jesmyn Ward	2025
Rosanna Warren	2005
John Edgar Wideman	2016
Joy Williams	2008
Terry Tempest Williams	2019
Garry Wills	1995
Tobias Wolff	2014
Charles Wright	1995
Kevin Young	2021

== Deceased members ==
Name	Life	Elected
Daniel Aaron	1912–2016	1997
M. H. Abrams	1912–2015	2001
Brooks Adams	1848–1927	1906
Charles Francis Adams Jr.	1835–1915	1905
Franklin P. Adams	1881–1960	1946
Henry Adams	1838–1918	1898
James Truslow Adams	1878–1949	1923
Léonie Adams	1899–1988	1951
George Ade	1866–1944	1908
Conrad Aiken	1889–1973	1941
Edward Albee	1928–2016	1966
Henry Mills Alden	1836–1919	1898
Edwin Anderson Alderman	1861–1931	1925
Thomas Bailey Aldrich	1836–1907	1898
Richard Aldrich	1863–1937	1908
Nelson Algren	1909–1981	1981
Hervey Allen	1889–1949	1936
James Lane Allen	1848–1925	1898
Winthrop Ames	1871–1937	1931
A. R. Ammons	1926–2001	1990
Maxwell Anderson	1888–1959	1935
Sherwood Anderson	1876–1941	1937
Roger Angell	1920–2022	2015
Charles M. Andrews	1863–1943	1937
Hannah Arendt	1906–1975	1964
Newton Arvin	1900–1963	1952
John Ashbery	1927–2017	1980
Gertrude Atherton	1857–1948	1938
Louis Auchincloss	1917–2010	1965
Wystan Hugh Auden	1907–1973	1948
Paul Auster	1947–2024	2006
Irving Babbitt	1865–1933	1920
Irving Bacheller	1859–1950	1920
Leonard Bacon	1887–1954	1941
George Pierce Baker	1866–1935	1916
Ray Stannard Baker	1870–1946	1920
Russell Baker	1925–2019	1984
James Baldwin	1924–1987	1964
Simeon E. Baldwin	1840–1927	1898
Russell Banks	1940–2023	1998
Amiri Baraka	1934–2014	2001
Djuna Barnes	1892–1982	1959
Philip Barry	1896–1949	1930
John Barth	1930–2024	1974
Donald Barthelme	1931–1989	1978
Jacques Barzun	1907–2012	1952
John Spencer Bassett	1867–1928	1923
Hamilton Basso	1904–1964	1955
Arlo Bates	1850–1918	1905
Charles Austin Beard	1874–1948	1939
Carl L. Becker	1873–1945	1933
William Beebe	1887–1962	1939
Samuel N. Behrman	1893–1973	1943
Saul Bellow	1915–2005	1958
Stephen Vincent Benét	1898–1943	1929
William Rose Benét	1886–1950	1933
Eric Bentley	1916–2020	1990
Bernard Berenson	1865–1959	1922
John Berryman	1914–1972	1965
Albert J. Beveridge	1862–1927	1920
John Bigelow	1817–1911	1898
William Henry Bishop	1847–1928	1918
Morris Bishop	1893–1973	1973
Joseph Bucklin Bishop	1847–1928	1923
Elizabeth Bishop	1911–1979	1954
R. P. Blackmur	1904–1965	1956
Harold Bloom	1930–2019	1990
Robert Bly	1926–2021	1987
Louise Bogan	1897–1970	1952
Catherine Drinker Bowen	1897–1973	1963
Claude Bowers	1878–1958	1937
Paul Bowles	1910–1999	1981
James Boyd	1888–1944	1938
Kay Boyle	1902–1992	1968
Gamaliel Bradford	1863–1932	1915
Roark Bradford	1896–1948	1947
Robert Bridges	1858–1941	1906
John Malcolm Brinnin	1916–1998	1978
Crane Brinton	1898–1968	1955
Joseph Brodsky	1940–1996	1979
Louis Bromfield	1896–1956	1928
Cleanth Brooks	1906–1994	1970
Gwendolyn Brooks	1917–2000	1976
Van Wyck Brooks	1886–1963	1925
John Mason Brown	1900–1969	1950
William Crary Brownell	1851–1928	1898
Robert Brustein	1927–2023	1999
Art Buchwald	1925–2007	1986
Pearl S. Buck	1892–1973	1936
Kenneth Burke	1897–1993	1951
William S. Burroughs	1914–1997	1983
John Burroughs	1837–1921	1898
Maxwell Struthers Burt	1882–1954	1926
Richard Burton	1861–1940	1908
Nicholas Murray Butler	1862–1947	1909
Witter Bynner	1881–1968	1962
James Branch Cabell	1879–1958	1937
George Washington Cable	1844–1925	1898
Erskine Caldwell	1903–1987	1942
Hortense Calisher	1911–2009	1977
Joseph Campbell	1904–1987	1973
Henry Seidel Canby	1878–1961	1931
Truman Capote	1924–1984	1964
Bliss Carman	1861–1929	1898
Rachel Carson	1907–1964	1953
Raymond Carver	1938–1988	1988
Willa Cather	1876–1947	1929
Bruce Catton	1899–1978	1955
Madison J. Cawein	1865–1914	1908
French Ensor Chadwick	1844–1919	1912
Robert W. Chambers	1865–1933	1909
Edward Channing	1856–1931	1911
Stuart Chase	1888–1985	1938
Hobart C. Chatfield-Taylor	1865–1945	1912
John Cheever	1912–1982	1957
John Vance Cheney	1848–1922	1908
Winston Churchill	1871–1947	1908
Marchette Chute	1909–1994	1957
John Ciardi	1916–1986	1957
Amy Clampitt	1920–1994	1987
Eleanor Clark	1914–1996	1968
Mark Twain	1835–1910	1898
Robert M. Coates	1897–1973	1958
Robert P. T. Coffin	1892–1955	1946
Mary Colum	1877–1957	1953
Padraic Colum	1881–1972	1948
Henry Steele Commager	1902–1998	1952
Evan S. Connell	1924–2013	1988
Marc Connelly	1890–1980	1935
James Brendan Connolly	1868–1957	1908
Moncure D. Conway	1832–1907	1898
Robert Coover	1923–2024	1987
Royal Cortissoz	1869–1948	1908
Malcolm Cowley	1898–1987	1949
James Gould Cozzens	1903–1978	1943
Francis Marion Crawford	1854–1909	1898
Robert Creeley	1926–2005	1987
Herbert Croly	1869–1930	1912
Wilbur Lucius Cross	1862–1948	1911
Rachel Crothers	1878–1958	1933
Samuel McChord Crothers	1857–1927	1906
E. E. Cummings	1894–1962	1949
Edward Dahlberg	1900–1977	1968
Augustin Daly	1838–1899	1898
H. L. Davis	1896–1960	1956
Owen Davis	1874–1956	1923
Charles DeKay	1848–1935	1905
Margaret Deland	1857–1945	1926
Babette Deutsch	1895–1982	1958
Bernard DeVoto	1897–1955	1948
Peter DeVries	1910–1993	1969
James Dickey	1923–1997	1972
Joan Didion	1934–2021	1981
E. L. Doctorow	1931–2015	1984
Theodore A. Dodge	1842–1909	1908
John Dos Passos	1896–1970	1937
W. E. Burghardt DuBois	1868–1963	1944
René Dubos	1901–1982	1979
Finley Peter Dunne	1867–1936	1908
Will Durant	1885–1981	1959
Walter Prichard Eaton	1878–1957	1918
Richard Eberhart	1904–2005	1960
Leon Edel	1907–1997	1964
Irwin Edman	1896–1954	1941
Harry Stillwell Edwards	1855–1938	1912
Maurice F. Egan	1852–1924	1908
Edward Eggleston	1837–1902	1898
Loren Eiseley	1907–1977	1971
Stanley Elkin	1930–1995	1982
Ralph Ellison	1914–1995	1964
Richard Ellmann	1918–1987	1971
John Erskine	1879–1951	1920
Robert Fagles	1933–2008	1998
James T. Farrell	1904–1979	1942
William Faulkner	1897–1962	1939
Edgar Fawcett	1847–1904	1898
Jules Feiffer	1929–2025	1995
Edna Ferber	1887–1968	1930
Francis Fergusson	1904–1986	1962
Lawrence Ferlinghetti	1919–2021	2003
Chester Bailey Fernald	1869–1938	1910
Leslie Fiedler	1917–2003	1988
Henry Theophilus Finck	1854–1926	1908
John Huston Finley	1863–1940	1908
Oscar W. Firkins	1864–1932	1912
M. F. K. Fisher	1908–1992	1991
Dorothy Canfield Fisher	1879–1958	1931
Willard Fiske	1831–1904	1898
Dudley Fitts	1903–1969	1957
Robert Fitzgerald	1910–1985	1962
Janet Flanner	1892–1978	1959
John Gould Fletcher	1886–1950	1949
Jefferson Butler Fletcher	1865–1946	1918
James Thomas Flexner	1908–2003	1976
Horton Foote	1916–2009	1998
Shelby Foote	1916–2005	1994
James Forbes	1871–1938	1922
Worthington C. Ford	1858–1940	1908
Paul Leicester Ford	1865–1902	1898
Paula Fox	1923–2017	2004
John Fox Jr.	1863–1919	1898
Waldo Frank	1889–1967	1952
Harold Frederic	1856–1898	1898
Douglas Southall Freeman	1886–1953	1937
Mary E. Wilkins Freeman	1852–1930	1926
Robert Frost	1874–1963	1916
Henry B. Fuller	1857–1929	1898
Horace H. Furness Jr.	1865–1930	1911
Horace Howard Furness	1833–1912	1905
William Gaddis	1922–1998	1984
Ernest J. Gaines	1933–2019	1998
John Kenneth Galbraith	1908–2006	1966
Hamlin Garland	1860–1940	1898
William H. Gass	1924–2007	1983
Peter Gay	1923–2015	1989
Franklin Henry Giddings	1855–1931	1918
Richard Watson Gilder	1844–1909	1898
Basil L. Gildersleeve	1831–1924	1906
Brendan Gill	1914–1997	1995
William Gillette	1853–1937	1898
Daniel Coit Gilman	1831–1908	1898
Lawrence Gilman	1878–1939	1908
Allen Ginsberg	1926–1997	1973
Ellen Glasgow	1873-1945	1932
Louise Glück	1943–2023	1996
Edwin Lawrence Godkin	1831–1902	1898
Parke Godwin	1816–1904	1898
Arthur Goodrich	1878–1941	1927
George A. Gordon	1853–1929	1898
Robert Grant	1852–1940	1898
Francine du Plessix Gray	1930–2019	1992
Julien Green	1900–1998	1972
Paul Eliot Green	1894–1981	1941
Ferris Greenslet	1875–1959	1908
Horace Gregory	1898-1982	1964
William Elliot Griffis	1843–1928	1898
Albert J. Guerard	1914–2000	1958
Francis Barton Gummere	1855–1919	1913
A. R. Gurney	1930–2017	2006
Francis Hackett	1883–1962	1949
Arthur Twining Hadley	1856–1930	1898
Hermann Hagedorn	1882–1964	1920
Emily Hahn	1905–1997	1987
Edward Everett Hale	1822–1909	1905
Donald Hall	1928–2008	1989
Clayton Hamilton	1881–1946	1912
Edith Hamilton	1867–1963	1955
Oscar Hammerstein II	1895–1960	1950
William Nathaniel Harben	1858–1919	1912
Elizabeth Hardwick	1916–2007	1977
Arthur Sherburne Hardy	1847–1930	1898
Henry Harland	1861–1905	1898
George McLean Harper	1863–1947	1911
Joel Chandler Harris	1848–1908	1905
Henry Sydnor Harrison	1880–1930	1914
Jim Harrison	1937–2016	2007
Bret Harte	1836–1902	1898
John Hawkes	1925–1998	1980
John Hay	1838–1905	1898
Robert Hayden	1913–1980	1979
Charles Downer Hazen	1868–1941	1918
Shirley Hazzard	1931–2016	1982
Anthony Hecht	1923–2004	1970
Joseph Heller	1923–1999	1977
Lillian Hellman	1905–1984	1946
William James Henderson	1855–1937	1914
Burton J. Hendrick	1870–1949	1923
Oliver Herford	1863–1935	1911
Joseph Hergesheimer	1880–1954	1920
James A. Herne	1839–1901	1898
Robert Herrick	1868–1938	1908
John Hersey	1914–1993	1950
DuBose Heyward	1885–1940	1937
John Grier Hibben	1861–1933	1912
Thomas Wentworth Higginson	1823–1911	1898
David Jayne Hill	1850–1932	1920
Robert Hillyer	1895–1961	1938
Ripley Hitchcock	1857–1918	1911
William Ernest Hocking	1873–1966	1947
John Hollander	1929–2013	1979
Brian Hooker	1880–1946	1912
Paul Horgan	1903–1995	1956
Bronson Howard	1842–1908	1898
Richard Howard	1929–2022	1983
Sidney Howard	1891–1939	1927
Irving Howe	1920–1993	1979
Julia Ward Howe	1819–1910	1907
Mark Anthony DeWolfe Howe	1864–1960	1908
William Dean Howells	1837–1920	1898
Hatcher Hughes	1884–1945	1924
Langston Hughes	1902–1967	1961
Rolfe Humphries	1894–1969	1953
James Gibbons Huneker	1860–1921	1918
Archer Milton Huntington	1870–1955	1911
Laurence Hutton	1843–1904	1898
Ada Louise Huxtable	1921–2013	1977
Christopher Isherwood	1904–1986	1949
Josephine Jacobsen	1908–2003	1994
Henry James	1843–1916	1898
Marquis James	1891–1955	1953
William James	1842–1910	1898
Randall Jarrell	1914–1965	1960
Robinson Jeffers	1887–1962	1937
Joseph Jefferson	1829–1905	1898
Denis Johnson	1949–2017	2014
Edgar Johnson	1901–1995	1975
Owen Johnson	1878–1952	1909
Robert Underwood Johnson	1853–1937	1898
Richard Malcolm Johnston	1822–1898	1898
Matthew Josephson	1899–1978	1948
Ward Just	1935–2019	2013
Donald Justice	1925–2004	1992
Justin Kaplan	1925–2014	1985
George S. Kaufman	1889–1961	1938
Alfred Kazin	1915–1995	1965
Donald Keene	1922–2019	1986
Helen Keller	1880–1968	1933
Murray Kempton	1918–1997	1995
George Kennan	1845–1924	1898
George F. Kennan	1904–2005	1962
Galway Kinnell	1927–2014	1980
Kenneth Koch	1925–2002	1996
Alfred Kreymborg	1883–1966	1949
Louis Kronenberger	1904–1980	1951
Joseph Wood Krutch	1893–1970	1937
Stanley Kunitz	1905–2006	1963
Christopher La Farge	1897–1956	1947
Oliver La Farge	1901–1963	1957
Richmond Lattimore	1906–1984	1965
James Laughlin	1914–1997	1995
Henry Charles Lea	1825–1909	1905
Harper Lee	1926–2016	2007
Edwin Lefevre	1871–1943	1916
Ursula K. LeGuin	1929–2018	2017
William Ellery Leonard	1876–1944	1926
Denise Levertov	1923–1997	1980
Harry Levin	1912–1994	1960
Philip Levine	1928–2015	1997
R. W. B. Lewis	1917–2002	1982
Sinclair Lewis	1885–1951	1935
Vachel Lindsay	1879–1931	1920
Romulus Linney	1930–2011	2002
Walter Lippmann	1889–1974	1932
Nelson Lloyd	1873–1933	1908
George Cabot Lodge	1873–1909	1908
Henry Cabot Lodge	1850–1924	1898
John Luther Long	1861–1927	1908
Barry Lopez	1945–2020	2020
Thomas Lounsbury	1838–1915	1898
Robert Morss Lovett	1870–1956	1908
A. Lawrence Lowell	1856–1943	1910
Robert Lowell	1917–1977	1954
John Livingston Lowes	1867–1945	1929
Charles Fletcher Lummis	1859–1928	1908
Alison Lurie	1926–2020	1989
Hamilton Wright Mabie	1846–1916	1898
Dwight Macdonald	1906–1982	1970
Percy MacKaye	1875–1956	1908
Archibald MacLeish	1892–1982	1933
Alfred Thayer Mahan	1840–1914	1898
Norman Mailer	1923–2007	1967
Bernard Malamud	1914–1986	1964
Janet Malcolm	1934–2021	2001
Thomas Mann	1875–1955	1950
Edwin Markham	1852–1940	1908
John P. Marquand	1893–1960	1940
Don Marquis	1878–1937	1923
Edward Sandford Martin	1856–1939	1908
Edgar Lee Masters	1869–1950	1918
Frank Jewett Mather	1868–1953	1913
Peter Matthiessen	1927–2014	1974
Brander Matthews	1852–1929	1898
F. O. Matthiessen	1902–1950	1948
William Keepers Maxwell	1908–2000	1963
Mary McCarthy	1912–1989	1960
J. D. McClatchy	1945–2018	1999
Anne O'Hare McCormick	1880–1954	1947
Carson McCullers	1917–1967	1952
David McCullough	1933–2022	2006
William McFee	1881–1966	1941
Phyllis McGinley	1905–1978	1955
St. Clair McKelway	1845–1915	1898
John Bach McMaster	1852–1932	1898
Terrence McNally	1938–2020	2018
Margaret Mead	1901–1978	1955
William Meredith	1919–2007	1968
James Merrill	1926–1995	1971
W. S. Merwin	1927–2019	1972
Josephine Miles	1911–1985	1980
Edna St. Vincent Millay	1892–1950	1929
Arthur Miller	1915–2005	1958
Charles Ransom Miller	1849–1922	1915
Henry Miller	1891–1980	1957
Joaquin Miller	1839–1913	1898
Czeslaw Milosz	1911–2004	1982
Donald Grant Mitchell	1822–1908	1898
John Ames Mitchell	1845–1918	1908
Joseph Mitchell	1908–1996	1970
Langdon Mitchell	1862–1935	1908
N. Scott Momaday	1934–2024	2022
William Vaughn Moody	1869–1910	1905
Charles Moore	1855–1942	1920
Marianne Craig Moore	1887–1972	1947
Paul Elmer More	1864–1937	1908
Samuel Eliot Morison	1887–1976	1963
Christopher Morley	1890–1957	1936
Harrison Smith Morris	1856–1948	1908
Wright Morris	1910–1998	1970
Toni Morrison	1931–2019	1981
John Torrey Morse	1840–1937	1906
Howard Moss	1922–1987	1971
John Muir	1838–1914	1898
Lewis Mumford	1895–1990	1930
Theodore T. Munger	1830–1910	1905
Albert Murray	1916–2013	1997
Ogden Nash	1902–1971	1950
Robert Nathan	1894–1985	1936
John G. Neihardt	1881–1973	1943
Henry Loomis Nelson	1846–1908	1898
Howard Nemerov	1920–1991	1960
Allan Nevins	1890–1971	1938
Meredith Nicholson	1866–1947	1908
Reinhold Niebuhr	1892–1971	1953
Anaïs Nin	1903–1977	1974
Charles Eliot Norton	1827–1908	1898
Rollo Ogden	1856–1937	1923
John O'Hara	1905–1970	1957
Eugene O'Neill	1888–1953	1923
Thomas Nelson Page	1853–1922	1898
Albert Bigelow Paine	1861–1937	1918
Grace Paley	1922–2007	1980
Dorothy Parker	1893–1967	1959
Will Payne	1865–1954	1908
William Morton Payne	1858–1919	1908
Donald Culross Peattie	1898–1964	1941
Harry Thurston Peck	1856–1914	1898
Walker Percy	1916–1990	1972
S. J. Perelman	1904–1979	1958
James Breck Perkins	1847–1910	1898
Bliss Perry	1860–1954	1905
Ralph Barton Perry	1876–1957	1942
Thomas Sergeant Perry	1845–1928	1898
William Lyon Phelps	1865–1943	1910
Arthur Stanwood Pier	1874–1966	1908
George Plimpton	1927–2003	2002
Richard Poirier	1925–2009	1999
Ernest Poole	1880–1950	1916
Katherine Anne Porter	1890–1980	1941
Ezra Pound	1885–1972	1938
J. F. Powers	1917–1999	1968
Reynolds Price	1933–2011	1988
Herbert Putnam	1861–1955	1925
Edward Kennard Rand	1871–1945	1933
John Crowe Ransom	1888–1974	1965
Marjorie Kinnan Rawlings	1896–1953	1939
Agnes Repplier	1858–1950	1926
Kenneth Rexroth	1905–1982	1969
James Ford Rhodes	1848–1927	1898
Elmer Rice	1892–1967	1938
Conrad Richter	1890–1968	1961
James Whitcomb Riley	1849–1916	1898
George Lockhart Rives	1849–1917	1914
Charles G. D. Roberts	1860–1943	1898
Elizabeth Madox Roberts	1881–1941	1941
Kenneth L. Roberts	1885–1957	1935
Edwin Arlington Robinson	1869–1935	1908
Theodore Roethke	1908–1963	1956
Theodore Roosevelt	1858–1919	1898
Elihu Root	1845–1937	1915
Philip Roth	1933–2018	1970
Josiah Royce	1855–1916	1898
Muriel Rukeyser	1913–1980	1967
John Russell	1919–2008	1996
Oliver Sacks	1933–2015	1996
Edward Said	1935–2003	2002
Harrison Salisbury	1908–1993	1972
James Salter	1925–2015	2000
Carl Sandburg	1878–1967	1933
George Santayana	1863–1952	1909
William Saroyan	1908–1981	1943
Meyer Schapiro	1904–1996	1976
Felix Emanuel Schelling	1858–1945	1911
Arthur M. Schlesinger Jr.	1917–2007	1961
Mark Schorer	1908–1977	1962
James Schouler	1839–1920	1912
Carl Schurz	1829–1906	1898
Montgomery Schuyler	1843–1914	1908
Clinton Scollard	1860–1932	1908
Horace Scudder	1838–1902	1898
Anne Douglas Sedgwick	1873–1935	1931
Ellery Sedgwick	1872–1960	1915
Henry Dwight Sedgwick	1861–1957	1908
Lore Segal	1928–2024	2023
Gilbert Seldes	1893–1970	1963
Ernest Thompson Seton	1860–1946	1905
Nathaniel Shaler	1841–1906	1898
Karl Shapiro	1913–2000	1959
Vincent Sheean	1899–1975	1941
Edward Brewster Sheldon	1886–1946	1918
Sam Shepard	1943–2017	1986
Frank Dempster Sherman	1860–1916	1908
Stuart Pratt Sherman	1881–1926	1918
Robert E. Sherwood	1896–1955	1937
Paul Shorey	1857–1934	1911
Charles Simic	1938–2023	1995
Upton Sinclair	1878–1968	1944
Isaac Bashevis Singer	1904–1991	1965
William Milligan Sloane	1850–1928	1898
Francis Hopkinson Smith	1838–1915	1898
William Jay Smith	1918–2015	1975
W. D. Snodgrass	1926–2009	1972
Susan Sontag	1933–2004	1979
Elizabeth Spencer	1921–2019	1985
Jean Stafford	1915–1979	1970
Edmund Clarence Stedman	1833–1908	1898
Francis Steegmuller	1906–1994	1966
Wallace Stegner	1909–1993	1969
John Steinbeck	1902–1968	1939
Wallace Stevens	1879–1955	1946
Burton E. Stevenson	1872–1962	1928
William James Stillman	1828–1901	1898
Frederic Jesup Stimson	1855–1943	1898
Frank R. Stockton	1834–1902	1898
Charles Warren Stoddard	1843–1909	1898
Robert Stone	1937–2015	1994
William Styron	1925–2006	1966
Mark Strand	1934–2014	1981
Julian Street	1879–1947	1924
Austin Strong	1881–1952	1929
Simeon Strunsky	1879–1947	1946
Thomas Russell Sullivan	1849–1916	1898
May Swenson	1913–1989	1970
Booth Tarkington	1869–1946	1908
Allen Tate	1899–1979	1949
James Tate	1943–2015	2004
Henry Osborn Taylor	1856–1941	1915
Peter Taylor	1917–1994	1969
Studs Terkel	1912–2008	1997
William Roscoe Thayer	1859–1923	1911
A. E. Thomas	1872–1947	1924
Augustus Thomas	1857–1934	1898
Lewis Thomas	1913–1993	1984
Dorothy Thompson	1894–1961	1938
Maurice Thompson	1844–1901	1898
Ashley Horace Thorndike	1871–1933	1913
Chauncey Brewster Tinker	1876–1963	1931
L. Frank Tooker	1855–1925	1911
Ridgely Torrence	1874–1950	1908
Edward W. Townsend	1855–1942	1914
Arthur Cheney Train	1875–1945	1924
William Peterfield Trent	1862–1939	1898
Lionel Trilling	1905–1975	1951
Barbara Tuchman	1912–1989	1968
Moses Coit Tyler	1835–1900	1898
Louis Untermeyer	1885–1977	1941
John Updike	1932–2009	1964
Carl Van Doren	1885–1950	1944
Mark Van Doren	1894–1972	1940
John Van Druten	1901–1957	1951
Mona Van Duyn	1921–2004	1983
Henry van Dyke Jr.	1852–1933	1898
John Charles Van Dyke	1856–1932	1908
Paul Van Dyke	1859–1933	1927
Hendrik Willem Van Loon	1882–1944	1938
Carl Van Vechten	1880–1964	1961
Helen Vendler	1933–2024	1993
Gore Vidal	1925–2012	1999
Herman Knickerbocker Vielé	1856–1908	1908
Kurt Vonnegut	1922–2007	1973
Charles Dudley Warner	1829–1900	1898
Austin Warren	1899–1986	1975
Charles Warren	1868–1954	1925
Robert Penn Warren	1905–1989	1950
William Weaver	1923–2013	1992
Eudora Welty	1909–2001	1952
Barrett Wendell	1855–1921	1898
Glenway Wescott	1901–1987	1947
Andrew Fleming West	1853–1943	1911
Edith Wharton	1862–1937	1926
John Hall Wheelock	1886–1978	1948
Andrew Dickson White	1832–1918	1898
E. B. White	1899–1985	1962
Edmund White	1940–2025	1996
Stewart Edward White	1873–1946	1908
William Allen White	1868–1944	1908
Charles Goodrich Whiting	1842–1922	1908
Brand Whitlock	1869–1934	1913
Elie Wiesel	1928–2016	1996
Richard Wilbur	1921–2017	1957
Thornton Wilder	1897–1975	1928
C. K. Williams	1936–2015	2003
Francis Howard Williams	1844–1922	1912
Jesse Lynch Williams	1871–1929	1908
Tennessee Williams	1911–1983	1952
William Carlos Williams	1883–1963	1950
August Wilson	1945–2005	1995
Harry Leon Wilson	1867–1939	1908
Lanford Wilson	1937–2011	2004
Woodrow Wilson	1856–1924	1898
William Winter	1836–1917	1898
Yvor Winters	1900–1967	1956
Owen Wister	1860–1938	1898
Thomas Wolfe	1900–1938	1937
Tom Wolfe	1930–2018	1999
George Edward Woodberry	1855–1930	1898
Frederick J. E. Woodbridge	1867–1940	1933
C. Vann Woodward	1908–1999	1970
James A. Wright	1927–1980	1974
Stark Young	1881–1963	1938
Marguerite Yourcenar	1903–1987	1982

== See also ==
- List of members of the American Academy of Arts and Letters Department of Art
- List of members of the American Academy of Arts and Letters Department of Music
