= Carlos Arnaiz Architects =

Architecture firm

CAZA - Carlos Arnaiz Architects
- Formation: 2009
- Headquarters: Brooklyn, NY
- Founder: Carlos Arnaiz
- Website: https://cazarch.com/

Carlos Arnaiz Architects, often referred to as CAZA, is a Brooklyn-based architecture firm and think-tank founded in 2009 by Carlos Arnaiz. With offices in Manila, Bogota, and Lima, the firm works on architecture and urban planning projects globally.

== Firm Background ==
The firm was established by Carlos Arnaiz in 2009. Arnaiz holds an MArch from the Harvard University Graduate School of Design, where he was also the recipient of the Alpha Rho Chi medal in 2003 and the Wheelwright Prize. Prior to setting up his practice, he worked at James Corner Field Operations and Stan Allen Architects. Arnaiz also teaches at the Graduate School of Architecture and Urban Design at Pratt Institute.

CAZA is most recognized for its research-driven, multidisciplinary approach to design that is rooted in the context and conditions of each place.

The firm first won international acclaim for their 100 Walls Church in Cebu, a structure consisting of 100 concrete walls representing the "diversity of churchgoers" and the "enigmatic nature of religion".

In 2015, the firm was named one of Architect magazine's Next Progressives.

Today, the firm designs for a wide range of clients globally in sectors ranging from healthcare, hospitality, transportation, education, and civic spaces.

== Selected Projects ==
Notable projects include:

- City Center Tower, Bonifacio Global City, Philippines
- Bench Tower, Bonifacio Global City, Philippines
- 100 Walls Church, Cebu City, Philippines
- Master plan for De La Salle University, Biñan, Philippines
- La Salle Church, Biñan, Philippines
- Ospital Pacifica de Juan and Juana Angara, Baler, Philippines
- Metropolitan Museum of Manila, Bonifacio Global City, Philippines

== Research ==
The studio also houses SURBA, Studio for Urban Analysis, an urbanism research venture Arnaiz co-founded with Harvard Graduate School of Design professor and former dean Peter G. Rowe. The research institute focuses on exploring urbanization at various scales, particularly in developing countries.

In 2020, Arnaiz and Rowe published When Urbanization Comes to Ground, a book of essays reflecting on CAZA and SURBA's work exploring urbanization in China, Colombia, and the Philippines.

== Publications ==
- When Urbanization Comes to Ground, published by ORO, 2019
- CAZA: 2011 - 2015, published by Actar, 2016
