= Thandi Loewenson =

Zimbabwean-British architect (born 1989)

- Born: 1989 (age 36–37); Harare, Zimbabwe
- Occupation: Architect
- Awards: 2024 Wheelwright Prize

Thandi Loewenson (Harare, 1989) is a Zimbawean-British architect and researcher. She received the Wheelwright Prize in 2024.

== Biography ==
Born in Harare, Loewenson holds a PhD in Architectural Design from The Bartlett, UCL in London. She is a co-founder of the architectural collective BREAK//LINE, formed at The Bartlett in 2018 to "oppose the trespass of capital, the indifference towards inequality, and the myriad frontiers of oppression present in architectural education and practice today."

In 2021, her project Lumumba in Space: African Space Programs and the Project of Liberation was awarded a Graham Foundation grant for research. Two years later, she received another Graham Foundation grant for her exhibition proposal The Uhuru Catalogue, which was featured in the 2023 Venice Biennale of Architecture and received a sppecial mention as part of the International Exhibition alongside Twenty Nine Studio / Sammy Baloji and Wolff Architects.

In 2024, she received the Wheelwright Prize for her proposal Black Papers: Beyond the Politics of Land, Towards African Policies of Earth & Air, which explores social and spatial dynamics in modern Africa and introduces a framework titled «The Entanglement of Earth and Air».
