= Oscar Riera Ojeda Publishers =

Independent publishing company

- Founded: 2008
- Founder: Oscar Riera Ojeda
- Headquarters location: Shenzhen, China
- Nonfiction topics: Architecture
- Official website: oscarrieraojeda.com

Oscar Riera Ojeda Publishers is an independent publishing company founded in 2008 specializing in contemporary architecture, building documentation, building design, industrial design, and architectural theory, as well as thematic compilations on cities, landscape architecture, digital architecture, sustainable architecture, architectural history, and architectural photography. The company offices are located in the United States, China, and Argentina. Thousands of volumes provide an overview of modernist architecture early twentieth-century masterworks from Edwin Lutyens and Frank Lloyd Wright through Ludwig Mies van der Rohe and Luis Barragán. High quality bookmaking craftsmanship has earned the company recognition for producing high-concept objets d’art books.

The company was founded in 2008 by editor and designer Oscar Riera Ojeda, b. 1966, Buenos Aires, Argentina. Previously, Mr. Riera Ojeda was founding Art Director at ORO Editions, and prior, Senior Managing Director at Novus Creative Group, publishing the Spanish-Argentinian series Casa Internacional as well as Contemporary World Architects, Ten Houses, Single Building, and Art and Architecture, and Whitney Library of Design. Company affiliate, the Beijing-based printer Artron Enterprises Ltd., is the recipient of Printing Industries of America's prestigious Benny award and hundreds of honors for excellence in art book making.

Oscar Riera Ojeda Publishers produces The Extraordinary Buildings Series (EB), available in digital and book format, to chronicle exceptional contemporary buildings constructed in China. In addition, the company has established The Architectural Photography Foundation (APF), to provide programs and services to professional architectural photographers including access to the largest global archival collection of contemporary architectural photography. Another branch of the company Limited is a network of galleries, archival mega-walls, and retail spaces located in Beijing, Shanghai, and Shenzhen to offer market data and worldwide retail distribution through a network of publishers, institutions, and collectors to archive, exhibit, promote and sell limited edition publications in the disciplines of art, architecture, photography, politics, literature, science, sports, and entertainment.

Oscar Riera Ojeda Publishers is an International team of designers, writers, editors, and publishing professionals focused on architecture and design and the book making as a form of cultural artifact. Oscar Riera Ojeda publishes monographs, special volumes, and series on world renown modernist architects such as Alvar Aalto, Aedas, Alberto Campo Baeza, BAK Architects, Bohlin Cywinski Jackson, Bedmar and Shi, Wendell Burnette, Hariri & Hariri, Ralph Johnson, Rodolpho Machado & Jorge Silvetti, José Oubrerie, George Ranalli, Kyu Sung Woo, and Lauretta Vinciarelli. The company works closely with Universities such as the School of Architecture of the University of Illinois at Urbana-Champaign; University of Texas College of Fine Arts, Austin; Harvard Graduate School of Design, Cambridge, Mass.; University of British Columbia, University of Toronto, and the Architectural Photography Foundation of Hong Kong and China. Key contributors are leading architectural historians and critics such as William J.R. Curtis, Paul Goldberger, Ada Louise Huxtable, Rodolphe el-Koury, Geoffrey London, Herbert Muschamp, and Anthony Vidler.

Oscar Riera Ojeda Publishers has received more than 45 Independent Book Publishers Association (IBPA) Benjamin Franklin Awards for editorial and design excellence.
