= Gerald M. McCue =

American architect (1928–2026)

Gerald Mallon McCue (December 5, 1928 – January 27, 2026) was an American architect.

== Life and career ==
McCue was a native of Woodland, California. His parents were Floyd F. McCue and Lenore Mallon. McCue earned bachelor's and master's degrees in architecture from the University of California, Berkeley in 1951 and 1952, respectively. While attending college, McCue was a draftsman for Henry Gutterson from 1947 to 1948. Between 1950 and 1953, McCue served as a designer under G. P. Milano, after which he became a partner in Milano's firm. In 1954, the firm became known as Gerald M. McCue and Associates, McCue subsequently moved his practice from Berkeley, California, to San Francisco. By 1970, the firm had been rebranded McCue Boone Tomsick, and McCue served as president until 1976, before retiring from practice in 2005. Concurrently with his architectural career, McCue served as a lecturer and professor at UC Berkeley from 1954 to 1976. Between 1976 and 1980, he was a professor at the Harvard Graduate School of Design. He then served as dean of the school until 1992. After vacating the deanship, McCue became John T. Dunlop Professor of Housing Studies within Harvard Kennedy School through 1996. In 2003, the Gerald M. McCue Professorship of Architecture was established with an endowment from Frank Stanton. The chair has been held by Preston Scott Cohen.

McCue died on January 27, 2026, at the age of 97.
