= Lauretta Vinciarelli =

Italian born Architect, artist, educator

- Vinciarelli c. 1977
- Born: August 2, 1943; Arbe, Italy (Rab, Yougoslavia)
- Died: August 3, 2011 (aged 68); New York City, US
- Education: Sapienza University of Rome
- Occupations: Architect, artist, educator
- Spouse: Peter Rowe
- Partner: Donald Judd

Lauretta Vinciarelli (August 2, 1943 – August 3, 2011) was an artist, architect, and professor of architecture at the collegiate level.

== Background and education ==
Born in Arbe, Italy, Lauretta Vinciarelli was the daughter of Alberto and Annunciata Cencioni Vinciarelli. The family later moved to Rome, where she grew up. Her father was an organist at St. Peter's Basilica in the Vatican, and her mother worked as a teacher.

Vinciarelli studied architecture at the Sapienza University of Rome and was accepted into the Ordine degli Architetti di Roma e del Lazio (the Italian Board of Architects). She practiced architecture in Rome before emigrating to the United States in 1968.

In 1993, she married Peter Rowe, a professor of architecture at Harvard University.

== Career ==
=== Education ===
After moving to the United States, Vinciarelli taught architecture design studio for many years at several institutions, including Rice University in Houston, Texas; the University of Illinois; Pratt Institute in Brooklyn; Columbia University; the City College of New York (CUNY); and the Open Atelier of Design and Architecture (OADA), a non-accredited design school founded by Giuseppe Zambonini in New York City.

=== Architecture ===
During the 1980s, Vinciarelli collaborated with Minimalist artist Donald Judd in New York City and in the American Southwest, particularly in Marfa, Texas. Marfa became a research site for theoretical postmodern architectural proposals such as Marfa II Project, Marfa (1978) and Untitled Drawings (1981). Vinciarelli employed a rigorously inductive methodology to define and integrate fundamental architectural and design components. Regarding the Marfa "hangar and courthouse" study, Vinciarelli stated that her aim was "to form a fabric".

In 1984, Vinciarelli and Judd submitted the winning entry for the Kennedy Square competition in Providence, Rhode Island. Their proposal drew upon Vinciarelli's earlier work, including her 1977 landscape architecture project for a system of urban gardens commissioned by the Regional Administration of Apulia in southern Italy. In 1986, Vinciarelli received an Artists Fellowship in Architecture from the New York Foundation for the Arts.

=== Art ===
From the early 1980s until her death, Vinciarelli created atmospheric watercolor-and-ink studies of hypothetical architectural spaces. Her work has been examined by scholars and critics, including Ada Louise Huxtable and K. Michael Hays in Not Architecture But Evidence That It Exists.

Vinciarelli was part of a notable group of contemporary paper architects that included Raimund Abraham, John Hejduk, Gaetano Pesce, Lebbeus Woods, and Aldo Rossi. Her use of water elements extended the "essence of architecture" through transparency and reflection.

Discussing her artwork, Vinciarelli noted: "The architectural space I have painted since 1987 does not portray solutions to specific demands of use; it is not the space of a project—at least not a project as the rational answer to a program."

== Collections ==
Vinciarelli's work is held in numerous private collections and cultural institutions, including the International Archive of Women in Architecture (IAWA) at Virginia Polytechnic Institute and State University; the National Gallery of Art in Washington, D.C.; the San Francisco Museum of Modern Art in California; the Avery Architectural and Fine Arts Library at Columbia University; and the Art Institute of Chicago.

A substantial body of Vinciarelli's work, including the luminous Orange Sound series, is held by the Museum of Modern Art in New York.

In 2015, MAXXI, the National Museum of 21st Century Arts in Rome, presented an exhibition on architecture that included a group of Vinciarelli's abstract watercolors donated by her family.

== Museum and archive collections ==
Lauretta Vinciarelli's work is held in several major international collections.

=== A.A.M. Architettura Arte Moderna ===
- Senza titolo, 1975

Mixed media on cardboard; 44.5 × 57 cm (each)

- Hangar + Courtyard, 1980

Ink and tempera on tracing paper; 39.5 × 64 cm (each)
Collection of Francesco Moschini and Gabriel Vaduva (acquired 2002)

=== San Francisco Museum of Modern Art, San Francisco, California ===
- Atrium in Red, 1992

Watercolor and ink on paper; 30 × 22 3/8 in. (76.2 × 56.83 cm)
SFMOMA Accessions Committee Fund (1977)

- Night #6, 1996

Watercolor and ink on paper; 30 × 22 5/8 in. (76.2 × 57.47 cm)
Accessions Committee Fund; gift of Frances and John Bowes, Emily L. Carroll and Thomas W. Weisel, Doris and Donald Fisher, Maria Monet Markowitz and Jerome Markowitz, Madeleine H. Russell, and the Modern Art Council (1997)

=== Carnegie Museum of Art, Pittsburgh, Pennsylvania ===
- Garden Structure; Untitled (perspective), 1986

Watercolor on heavy paper; 13½ × 16¾ in. (34.29 × 42.55 cm)
Heinz Architectural Center; gift of the Drue Heinz Trust

=== National Gallery of Art, Washington, D.C. ===
- Long Horizon II [center], 1995

74 × 102.7 cm (29 1/8 × 40 7/16 in.)

- Long Horizon II [left], 1995

74 × 104 cm (29 1/8 × 40 15/16 in.)

- Long Horizon II [right], 1995

74 × 104 cm (29 1/8 × 40 15/16 in.)
Watercolor and pastel over graphite on heavy woven paper
Gift of Roger and Mrs. Ferris; Rowland and Eleanor Miller; and Eric and Ellen Somberg (1998)
Accession nos. 1998.26.1–3

=== Museum of Modern Art, New York, New York ===
- Orange Sound, project, seven-part watercolor series, 1999

Watercolor, graphite, and color ink on paper; 30 × 22 in. (76.2 × 55.9 cm)
Gift of the Mrs. Gianluigi Gabetti Purchase Fund
Accession nos. 1417.2000.1–1417.2000.7
e-card available

=== International Archive of Women in Architecture (IAWA) ===
- Lauretta Vinciarelli Art Work

Eleven untitled tempera drawings on board
IAWA Small Collections, Special Collections (1907–2013)
Virginia Polytechnic Institute and State University

== Exhibitions ==
The work of Lauretta Vinciarelli has been published and presented in solo and group exhibitions at galleries and museums internationally.

=== Solo shows ===
- 1978: Lauretta Vinciarelli: Projects 1973–78. Institute for Architecture and Urban Studies; Wave Hill, New York, N.Y.
- 1980: Lauretta Vinciarelli: Processo Metafora. Progetti e disegni, 1974–1980. A.A.M. Architettura Arte Moderna, Rome, Italy.
- 1981: Lauretta Vinciarelli: Projects 1980–81. Young Hoffman Gallery, Chicago, Illinois.
- 1982: Lauretta Vinciarelli: Projects. Princeton University Graduate School of Design, Princeton, New Jersey.
- 1992: Lauretta Vinciarelli: Red Room, Water Enclosures, and Other Unfolding Spaces. GSAPP, Columbia University, New York.
- 1992: Lauretta Vinciarelli: Rotte Räume. Museum für angewandte Kunst, Vienna, Austria.
- 1996: Spatial Reverberations: Watercolors by Lauretta Vinciarelli. National Building Museum, Washington, D.C.
- 1997: Reflections: Watercolors by Lauretta Vinciarelli. Gund Hall Gallery, Harvard Graduate School of Design.
- 1999: Incandescence: Watercolors by Lauretta Vinciarelli. San Francisco Museum of Modern Art, California.
- 2002: Lauretta Vinciarelli: Intimate Distance. Henry Urbach Architecture, New York City.
- 2012: Clear Light: The Architecture of Lauretta Vinciarelli. City College of New York, New York.

=== Group shows ===
- 1975: Goodbye Five: Work by Young Architects. Institute for Architecture and Urban Studies, New York, New York.
- 1975: Architectural Studies and Projects. Museum of Modern Art, New York, New York.
- 1977: Drawing for a More Modern Architecture. The Drawing Center, New York, New York.
- 1977: Women in American Architecture: A Historic and Contemporary Perspective. Brooklyn Museum, N.Y., and Hayden Gallery, MIT.
- 1978: Architectural Drawings. Otis Art Institute, Los Angeles, California.
- 1979: Elements of Architecture. Sperone Westwater Fisher Gallery, New York, New York.
- 1980: Art by Architects. Rosa Esman Gallery, New York, New York.
- 1980: Creation and Recreation: America Draws. Jugend Hall, Museum of Finnish Architecture, Helsinki, Finland.
- 1980: Desire as Archetype: The Chicago Tribune Tower Competition / Late Entries.
- 1980: Young Architects. Yale School of Architecture, New Haven, Connecticut.
- 1985: Project for Palmanova. Venice Biennale of Architecture, 3rd International Exhibition of Architecture.
- 1991: Contemporary Architectural Drawings. Miriam & Ira D. Wallach Art Gallery and Arthur Ross Gallery, Columbia University, New York.
- 1997: Summer Group Show. Max Protetch Gallery, New York, New York.
- 2001: Inside Out: New Perspectives on the Heinz Architectural Center's Collection. Heinz Architectural Center, Carnegie Museum of Art, Pittsburgh, Pennsylvania.
- 2002: Luminous Void Volume of Light (2001). Whitney Biennial, Whitney Museum of American Art, New York City.
- 2002: Italian Architecture Signs Since the War. Dalla Collezione Francesco Moschini, A.A.M. Architettura Arte Moderna, Florence, Italy.
- 2003: Visions and Utopias: Architectural Drawings from the Museum of Modern Art. New York, N.Y.; Museum of Finnish Architecture, Helsinki, Finland.
- 2004: Watercolor Worlds: Lauretta Vinciarelli et al. Dorsky Gallery, New York.
- 2004: Envisioning Architecture: Drawings from the Museum of Modern Art, New York. National Building Museum, Washington, D.C.
