= George Ranalli =

American architect

George Ranalli, FAIA
- Born: George Joseph Ranalli; 1946 (age 79–80); New York
- Education: Pratt Institute; Harvard University
- Occupation: Architect
- Awards: Sydney L. Strauss Award, Stanford White Award
- Practice: Architect, curator, scholar, higher education administrator
- Website: georgeranalli.com georgeranallidesigns.com

George Joseph Ranalli (born 1946) is an American modernist architect, scholar, curator, and fellow of the American Institute of Architects. He is based in New York City.

== Early life and education ==
A native of The Bronx, New York, of Italian American descent, he was inspired to become an architect at the age of about 13 when he saw the then-unfinished Guggenheim Museum, which was designed by Frank Lloyd Wright. Ranalli attended Mount Saint Michael Academy high school in New York City and graduated in 1964. From 1967 to 1968, he attended New York Institute of Technology, and Pratt Institute, Brooklyn, New York, where he received a Bachelor of Architecture in 1972. Thereafter, Ranalli attended Harvard Graduate School of Design, Cambridge, Massachusetts, earning a Master of Architecture in 1974. Upon graduation, he traveled on a research grant throughout Europe before returning to New York.

== Career ==
Ranalli founded his firm, "George Ranalli, Architect", in New York in 1977. Early on, architecture critic Paul Goldberger described Ranalli in a New York Times article as one of the "better younger architects" working in the Modernist idiom. Goldberger stated that Ranalli's designs were tied "as closely to the ancient craft of building as to the modern business of churning out huge commercial projects, yet they bespeak a consistent awareness of the realities of our age as well." In 1991, Michael Sorkin described Ranalli as "a creator and preserver of worlds, a precisionist." Ranalli is credited with carrying forward the lessons of Italian architect Carlo Scarpa into new settings. Architecture critic Ada Louise Huxtable wrote that Ranalli's "purpose is to move modernism into an enriched and more deeply referenced style." In 1996, Yale University granted Ranalli a Master of Arts degree, honoris causa. In 2015, Architectural Record described Ranalli's career as a Gesamtkunstwerk. Ranalli's industrial design objects, such as door hardware, furniture, and glassware are recognized as art. The firm George Ranalli Architect is credited with innovating total design concepts for interior architecture and furniture design.

=== Selected architecture ===
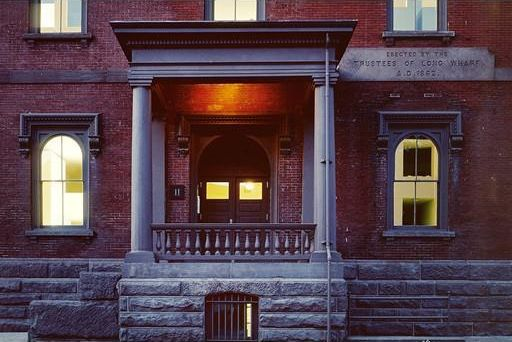
Callender School, Newport, Rhode Island

- 2018: The National school House for Theater Arts Masterplan, New York City
- 2009: Saratoga Avenue Community Center, Brownsville, Brooklyn, a public-building project for New York City Housing Authority
- 2002: Masterplan for The City College of New York 36.5 acres (147,710.2594 m^{2}) (plan only, unbuilt)
- 1996: K-Loft, urban dwelling (interior)
- 1990: Fashion Center Building, 525 Seventh Avenue
- 1982: The Peak Competition,; 8 Severn Road, Victoria Peak, Hong Kong, completed 2006
- 1981: Callander School Renovation/ Restoration, Newport, Rhode Island
- 1977: First of August/ August Too boutique, New York City

=== Museum and gallery exhibitions ===
Ranalli has been exhibited in New York City at the Metropolitan Museum of Art, Whitney Museum of American Art, MoMA, Cooper-Hewitt National Design Museum, American Craft Museum, Skyscraper Museum, Architectural League of New York, American Institute of Architects, Sperone Westwater Fisher gallery, Artists Space, and The Drawing Center.

Throughout the United States, Ranalli has contributed to exhibitions at Bass Museum, Memphis Brooks Museum of Art, Denver Art Museum, Indianapolis Museum of Art, Yale University, The Art Institute of Chicago, Graham Foundation for Advanced Studies in the Fine Arts, Museum of Contemporary Art, Chicago, Otis Art Institute, and the Library of Congress.

International exhibitions of Ranalli's work include Centre Pompidou, Canadian Centre for Architecture, Museum of Finnish Architecture, XVII Triennale di Milano, and Design Museum, Helsinki.

=== Professional recognition ===
Ranalli has received professional awards from the College of Fellows of the American Institute of Architects in 2015, the New York Society of Architects, New York Foundation for the Arts, and the Architectural League of New York.

Between 1969 and 2015, Ranalli received design awards from the Society of American Registered Architects; American Institute of Architects, and Progressive Architecture. In 2015, he received the Stanford White Award.

== Academia ==
Ranalli was a professor of architectural design and visual studies at Yale University School of Architecture & Environmental Design for 23 years, from 1976 to 1999. From 1987 to 1999, Ranalli along belonged to the fellowship of Morse College at Yale University.

Ranalli has been a visiting professor of architectural design and drawing at colleges and universities, such as Boston Architectural Center, Rhode Island School of Design, University of Illinois at Chicago, Institute for Architecture and Urban Studies, and Cooper Union.

From 1999 to 2017, Ranalli ran the architecture department at the City College of New York. In 2005, he was honored with the Renaissance Award from the Alumni Association of the City College School of Architecture.

=== Curation ===
Ranalli is known for work in the areas of architecture curation.

Yale School of Architecture

- Paul Rudolph: Drawing For Architecture 1956–1963, October 1 – November 23, 1977
- Young Architects, January 14 – February 1, 1980
- Diana Agrest/Mario Gandelsonas, January 2–30, 1981
- Raimund Abraham, Collisions, October 26 – December 4, 1981
- Helmut Jahn, November 1 – December 3, 1982
- Gaetano Pesce, October 31 – December 2, 1982
- Carlo Scarpa: Drawings for the Brion Family Cemetery, October 22 – November 23, 1984

Architecture Department, City College of New York

- Architecture With and Without Le Corbusier: José Oubrerie Architect, 2010
- Clear Light: The Architecture of Lauretta Vinciarelli, 2011–2012
- James Wines: A Line Around an Idea, September 20, 2012 - April 5, 2013
- Building the Modern Gothic: George B. Post at City College, February 4, 2013 – May 5, 2014
- La Sagrada Familia: Gaudi's Unfinished Masterpiece, Geometry, Construction and Site, September 2014 – May 2015

=== Monographic publications ===
- Ranalli, G. (2015) In Situ: George Ranalli Works & Projects. Shinzen, China: Oscar Riera Ojeda Publishers.
- Ranalli, G. (2009) Saratoga. San Raphael, CA: ORO Editions.
- Ranalli, G. (1999) Casas Internacional: George Ranalli, Oscar Riera Ojeda (ed.). Buenos Aires: Kliczowski Publishers.
- Ranalli, G. (1990) Tokushū: Jōji Ranari = Special feature: George Ranalli. Tokyo, Japan: A + U Publishing Co., Ltd.
- Ranalli, G. (1990) Bauten und Projekte = Constructions et Projets. Zürich: Verlag für Architektur Artemis.
- Ranalli, G. (1988) George Ranalli: Buildings and Projects. New York: Princeton Architectural Press.
