= Elizabeth Whitaker =

Elizabeth Whitaker may refer to:

- Elizabeth Whitaker (Wyandot)
- Elizabeth Whitaker (author) and inventor
- Elizabeth Whittaker, character in Poirot's Hallowe'en Party
- Elizabeth Whittaker, architect and educator
