= Mark Lee (architect) =

Hong Kong-born American architect and educator

- Born: Mark Wai Tak Lee; September 2, 1967 (age 59); Hong Kong
- Education: University of Southern California; Harvard University
- Occupation: Architect
- Spouse: Sharon Johnston
- Practice: Johnston Marklee & Associates
- Website: johnstonmarklee.com

Mark Wai Tak Lee (born September 2, 1967) is a Hong Kong-born American architect and educator, who is based in Cambridge and Los Angeles. Lee is principal and founding partner, along with his wife Sharon Johnston, of the architecture firm Johnston Marklee & Associates, which was founded in 1999. He is also Professor in the Practice of Architecture and Chair of the Department of Architecture at the Harvard University Graduate School of Design.

== Career ==
Born in Hong Kong, Lee earned a Bachelor of Architecture from the University of Southern California School of Architecture, and then went on to the Harvard University Graduate School of Design, where he received a Master of Architecture in 1995.

Upon graduating, Lee began his teaching career at the ETH Zurich as an instructor until 1998. At the end of that year, he was appointed as Lecturer (1998-2001) and then as adjunct professor (2001-2004) at the University of California, Los Angeles. In 2004, Lee taught as an assistant professor until 2008. From that year on, he took up various guest professorships at Technische Universität Berlin (2009-2011), Rice University (2013), Oslo School of Architecture and Design (2015), Princeton University School of Architecture (2016), as well as an annual appointment as Design Critic in Architecture at Harvard's Graduate School of Design.

In 2017, Lee and Johnston served as artistic directors for the Chicago Architecture Biennial.

In 2018, Lee was appointed Professor in the Practice of Architecture and Chair of the Department of Architecture at Harvard's Graduate School of Design.
