= Grace La =

Korean-American architect and designer

- Education: Harvard College (A.B), Harvard University Graduate School of Design (M.Arch.)
- Occupations: Principal, LA DALLMAN Professor of Architecture, Chair of the Department of Architecture, Harvard University GSD
- Awards: Progressive Architecture Award (2021) Rice Design Alliance Prize (2011) Emerging Voice of the Architectural League (2010) Bruner Award for Urban Excellence Silver Medal (2007) Boston Society of Architects (4) (2017, 2017, 2019, 2022) Association of Collegiate Schools of Architecture Faculty Design Award (4) American Institute of Architects Wisconsin Design Awards (9); AIA New England (1)
- Practice: LA DALLMAN (1999-present)
- Projects: Kilbourn Tower, Marsupial Bridge & Media Garden, Miller Brewing Company Meeting Center, Marcus Center for the Performing Arts Wilson Theater at Vogel Hall & New Riverwalk Entrance, Master Plan for the Menomonee Valley 2.0
- Website: ladallman.com

Grace La (United States, 1970; Korean: 나은영; Korean pronunciation: Na Eun Young) is a first generation, Korean-American designer, Chair of the Department of Architecture and Professor of Architecture at the Harvard University Graduate School of Design (GSD), and Principal of LA DALLMAN. Co-founded with James Dallman, LA DALLMAN is a design firm recognized for the multidisciplinary integration of architecture, infrastructure, and landscape, with offices in Boston, MA and Milwaukee, WI. La previously served as the Chair of the Harvard GSD's Practice Platform and served as GSD's Director of the Master of Architecture Programs (2014–17).

== Early life and education ==
La was raised in the New England area and studied at Phillips Academy in Andover, MA. As a boarding student, she studied visual arts in the Andover curriculum pioneered by Gordon "Diz" Bensley and was awarded the Pamela Wiedenman Memorial Prize in Art. At Andover, she also participated in the Dakar Project involving the renovation of an elementary school on Goree Island in Senegal, West Africa, which was formative to her later pursuit of architecture. She joined the Andover Exeter Washington Intern Program, in which she interned for Congressman Gerry Studds of Massachusetts.

La received her professional degree of Master of Architecture from Harvard University Graduate School of Design; her thesis was granted the honor of distinction and her project won the Clifford Wong Housing Prize. In college, she was a recipient of the Elizabeth Cary Agassiz Award and the John Harvard Scholarship (reserved for the top 5% of students based on GPA), graduating A.B. magna cum laude from Harvard College in Visual and Environmental Studies.

== Family ==
La (Note: The surname of “Na” was transliterated to “La” upon immigration to the U.S. in the 1950s; all members of the Na family residing in the U.S. use the surname “La.” However, the surname of Na is actively in use in South Korea by all members of the family residing there.) is the granddaughter of Na Duk Whan, (Note: Na Duk Whan was a distinguished theologian, intellectual, and South Korean Presbyterian minister, who served as the Moderator of the General Assembly of the Korean Presbyterian Church in 1961. Na Duk Whan was exhumed from his original interment site and re-buried in the Daejeon National Cemetery of Korea as a national honoree in 1991.) a South Korean leader recognized for his role in the resistance to the Japanese occupation of Korea, for which he was twice imprisoned in 1921 and 1940, (Note: As a proponent of religious and cultural freedom and for his resistance to the Japanese occupation of South Korea, Na Duk Whan was imprisoned twice, for 6 months in 1921 and for four years from 1940-1944.) and for his charitable acts as memorialized in the book, A Beautiful Heritage of Faith. (Note: A Beautiful Heritage of Faith(2012) by Na Key Yound outlines his founding of the First Presbyterian Church in Suncheon and his notable charitable acts, including his personal sacrifices for the independence of Korea.) La's design work for non-profit and mission based entities is rooted in the deep appreciation for service and civic engagement, which were instilled in her from her grandfather.

As noted in La's 2014 One Harvard address, La is the middle of three siblings, all educated at Harvard University. La's parents, Dr. and Mrs. Jea Min La of Long Island, NY, were scholars who immigrated to the United States in the 1950s. La is the younger sister of Elinor L. Hoover (Harvard Business School, ‘94), Global Co-Head of Consumer Products and Vice Chairman of Capital Markets Origination at Citigroup. (Note: In 2014, 2015, and 2016, Hoover was named multiple times in the list of the 25 Most Powerful Women in Finance (American Banker). Hoover is Chairman of the Board of Directors of the Chamber Music Society of Lincoln Center.) La is the older sister of Daniel La, an organic chemist who is Vice President and Head of Medicinal Chemistry at TRIANA Biomedicines and a former Postdoctoral Fellow of the renowned David Evans Lab at Harvard University.

== Career ==
Grace La is Principal of LA DALLMAN, co-founded with James Dallman in 1999. Since 2013, she is the Professor of Architecture at the Harvard University Graduate School of Design (GSD). She also served as Director of the GSD's Master of Architecture Programs in 2014–17. La is the Chair of the GSD's Practice Platform (2014–present), an interdisciplinary committee focused on issues of contemporary and future design practice. Prior to these academic positions, she was a tenured faculty member at the University of Wisconsin-Milwaukee School of Architecture & Urban Planning, holding the positions of Professor (2013), Associate Professor (2005-13) and Assistant Professor (1999-2005). She held visiting appointments at the Harvard University Graduate School of Design (2010) and Syracuse University.

LA DALLMAN, her practice with partner James Dallman, is engaged in the transformation of site through spatial and material investigations ranging in type and scale. Noted for their unusual ability in the design and execution of complex projects by the Architectural Record, the firm has received numerous professional honors and exhibited and published widely.

Grace La co-edited Skycar City with Winy Maas, co-founded and edited UWM's Calibrations, and was a member of the design editorial board of the Journal of Architectural Education for two terms. Her past research and teaching at UWM were funded by the international furniture manufacturer, KI, and resulted in numerous designed objects and prototypes, including a mass-customized public seating prototype exhibited at Discovery World. This work was featured in the Design Innovations Panel of the Metropolis Conference at ICFF in 2010.

As Director of the GSD's M.Arch Programs, La was responsible for both the M.Arch I and M.Arch II architecture degree programs, the largest department constituency at the GSD. During this period, she re-tooled the architecture department's admissions process, resulting in the highest admissions yield in the history of the school. As Chair of the Practice Platform, La oversees curriculum development and programs in the area of design practice and is the host of Talking Practice, Harvard GSD's inaugural podcast series launched in October 2018. Exploring matters and methods of practice, La has engaged podcast interviews with renowned designers such as Shohei Shigematsu, Jeanne Gang, Reinier de Graaf, Anna Heringer, Paul Nakazawa, Gary Hilderbrand, Preston Scott Cohen, and others.

In September 2019- January 2020, La co-curated with Jeremy Ficca and Amy Kulper, an exhibition entitled, "Drawing Attention," at the Roca London Gallery. The exhibition, gathering more than seventy five exemplary contemporary architectural drawings, opened during the London Design Festival. The exhibit was reviewed by the Royal Institute of British Architects among others, and was noted as a top exhibit to see in November 2019 by London's Guardian. Together with Ficca and Kulper, La was also the Co-Chair of the Association of Collegiate Schools of Architecture's 107th Annual Conference, entitled "Black Box: Articulating Architecture's Core in the Post-Digital Era" in 2019, leading the national debate on questions of design pedagogy. According to the ACSA, the conference generated more than four hundred submissions, the largest quantity of responses in the last decade.

== Honors and awards ==
La received four Faculty Design Awards from Association of Collegiate Schools of Architecture, honoring her for her projects that have "advance[d] the reflective nature of practice and teaching". La received a university-wide honor from UWM for her exemplary teaching and research with the UWM Distinguished Teaching Award in 2005.

La's award-winning practice, LA DALLMAN, is honored with a 2021 Progressive Architecture Award, nine Design Awards from the American Institute of Architects Wisconsin, three Boston Society of Architects Unbuilt Design Awards, and multiple international design competition awards. LA DALLMAN was named a 2010 Emerging Voice by the Architectural League of New York and received the Bruner Award for Urban Excellence Silver Medal. The firm received the international Spotlight: The Rice Design Alliance Prize in 2011, honoring "exceptionally gifted architects in the early phase of their career." Grace La and James Dallman are the first North American practitioners to receive the prize, which was previously awarded to architects Antón García-Abril of Spain and Sou Fujimoto of Japan.

In March 2021, LA DALLMAN's transformation of the Teweles & Brandeis Granary in Sturgeon Bay Wisconsin was celebrated as the cover image of Architect Magazine, the Journal of the American Institute of Architects. LA DALLMAN's work is featured in publications by Spain's a+t, Architect Magazine, Architectural Record, Azure, Praxis, Princeton Architectural Press, Routledge, and Topos. They had exhibitions at the 2025 Chicago Architecture Biennial, the Carnegie Museum of Art Heinz Architectural Center and the Danish Architecture Centre in Copenhagen, Denmark. LA DALLMAN has given lectures in numerous symposia and esteemed institutions such as the Museum of Fine Arts in Houston, the National Building Museum in Washington D.C., and the New Museum in New York City.

== Notable projects ==
LA DALLMAN is renowned for the design and execution of the Crossroads Project: Marsupial Bridge and Media Garden, and urban transformation project begun in 1999 and lasting more than a decade. This four-phased infrastructural transformation for public use includes a pedestrian bridge of 700 feet length named Marsupial Bridge, a bus shelter, a media garden, and a viewing deck. The project has been published and exhibited broadly, including a full-scale mock-up of the media garden "lightslabs", in the Reprogramming the City exhibit at the Danish Architecture Centre.

Among others, La's completed projects co-authored with partner, James Dallman, include the Miller Brewing Company Meeting Center (headquarters originally designed by mid-century architect, Ulrich Franzen), permanent science exhibits for Discovery World, the Marsupial Bridge and Media Garden, the Kilbourn Tower, the UWM Hillel Student Center, and several prominent residences including the Levy House and the Pavilion House in Wisconsin. At the time of its completion in 2005, Kilbourn Tower was the tallest residential building in Wisconsin and ranks as the 14th tallest building designed by a woman. Known for expertise of mid-century modern buildings, LA DALLMAN was shortlisted in 2018 for the renovation of the American Repertory Theater, originally designed by Hugh Stubbins. LA DALLMAN completed the renovation of Wilson Theater at Vogel Hall and a new river entrance at the Marcus Center for the Performing Arts, originally designed by Harry Weese.
