= Lesley Chang =

American architect and designer

Lesley Chang is an American architect and designer who co-founded the architecture firm StudioKCA alongside Jason Klimoski.

== Biography ==
Chang received her Bachelor of Arts degree in architecture from Columbia University. She completed her Master's degree in architecture at the Harvard Graduate School of Design. As a student, Chang participated in several design projects working under the German architect James Ingo Freed and his firm Pei Cobb Freed & Partners, as well as Marpillero Pollak Architects.

Chang has been affiliated with Steven Holl and Gensler, involved with the design of the Herning Museum of Contemporary Art in Denmark; and HBO Headquarters in New York City.

== StudioKCA ==
The public architecture installation Head in the Clouds... was completed for the 2013 edition of FIGMENT in Governor's Island Park, New York. It was one of the winners of the American Institute of Architects's Small Projects Awards. The structure is created using 53,780 recycled bottles. StudioKCA was able to collect the bottles and construct the space with over 200 volunteers.Sand, water jugs, and aluminium provide seating for around 50 people within the pavilion. This design won multiple awards, including: 2013 Interior Design Best of Year Award; 2014 Architizer A+ Award Finalist; and the 2016 Chicago Athenaeum American Architecture Award.

The NASA Orbit Pavilion was located first in New York City for the 2015 World Science Festival before being moved to the Huntington Library, Art Collection, and Botanical Gardens in 2016. The aluminum structure and surround sound speakers, designed by Shane Myrbeck from Arup SoundLab, relay the noises of NASA satellites in space.

Working with the nonprofit group Friends of Governors Island in 2017, StudioKCA designed mobile information units to try to bring solar powered, wireless connection to the public in Governors Island as information stations.

The Skyscraper project, otherwise known as The Bruges Whale, was completed in 2018 by StudioKCA with the help of sponsor Triennale Brugge. The 38-foot-tall blue whale is composed of over 5 tons of plastic collected from the Pacific Ocean and picked from Hawaiian beaches by StudioKCA, the Hawaii Wildlife Fund, and the Surfrider Foundation Kaui Chapter.
