= Diane E. Davis =

American sociologist

Diane E. Davis is the Charles Dyer Norton Professor of Regional Planning and Urbanism at the Harvard Graduate School of Design (GSD). Since 2023 she has been Co-director of the Canadian Institute for Advanced Research (CIFAR) program titled Humanity's Urban Future (HUF).

== Background ==
Davis grew up in Webster Groves, Missouri. She earned a BA in Sociology and Geography from Northwestern University, where she worked with the Citizens Action Program (CAP), a Saul Alinsky-inspired grassroots organization fighting redlining. Davis also earned a Ph.D. in Sociology from UCLA. Her dissertation advisors were Maurice Zeitlin and Manuel Castells, with Ed Soja, John Friedman and Jeffrey Alexander serving on her thesis committee at various stages.

Davis started her academic career at the Graduate Faculty of the New School for Social Research where she held a joint appointment in Sociology and Historical Studies. After, Davis served as the Associate Dean of the School of Architecture and Planning at MIT. Davis joined Harvard GSD in 2012 as Professor of Urbanism and Development, and was appointed Charles Dyer Norton Professor.

== Career ==
Davis's first book, Urban Leviathan: Mexico City in the Twentieth Century (Temple University Press, 1994), examines the relationship between urbanization and national development in Mexico through the lens of political conflicts over the territorial expansion of Mexico City and investments in transportation infrastructure. According to Judith Adler Hellman, "Davis seeks to understand 'what explains the rapid and uncontrolled urban development of Mexico City' and how 'administrative practices and urban development policies … [have] been influenced by—and in turn influenced—local and national politics".

Her second book was Discipline and Development: Middle Classes and Prosperity in East Asia and Latin America (Cambridge University Press, 2004). In a review published in Pacific Affairs, one scholar noted that Davis "adds that a regime's social bases inform whether that state can be disciplinary". In Contemporary Sociology, the reviewer wrote that Discipline and Development "makes insightful theoretical and empirical contributions to the fields of class analysis and comparative economic sociology".

Davis has edited volumes such as Irregular Armed Forces and their Role in Politics and State Formation and Transforming Urban Transport (OUP, 2018, with Alan Altshuler).

In Cities and Sovereignty: Identity Politics in Urban Spaces, Davis contrasted empires, city-states, and nation-states to argue that the latter regime type produced the least inclusive and most violent urban governance patterns. A reviewer in International Journal of Urban and Regional Research noted that the collection examines "the dynamics of identity-based conflicts and national sovereignty". Another review, published in Political Science Quarterly, described the book as "timed perfectly to lead the conversation about urban uprisings" and emphasized Davis and Libertun de Duren's argument that globalization has intensified urban diversity, making cities "incubators of identity-based conflict."

Starting in 2023, Davis became co-director of Humanity's Urban Future, a five-year program funded by the Canadian Institute for Advanced Research (CIFAR). This initiative convenes scholars to study urban futures through case studies in Calcutta, Toronto, Shanghai, Naples, Mexico City, and Kinshasa, focusing on infrastructure, political divisions, climate change, and urban equity.

== Editorial and professional service ==
Davis has served as principal editor for Political Power and Social Theory, contributing editor for the Handbook of Latin American Studies (Library of Congress), and editorial board member for journals including Urban Planning, Journal of Planning Education and Research, City & Community, and Journal of Latin American Studies.

== Honors and awards ==
- Remarkable Women in Transportation Award (April 2019). Named one of top 50 women in research on transport by the German Development Agency/Transforming Urban Mobility Initiative (TUMI). 5.
- Nominee, Outstanding Woman Historian of the Year, Journal of Urban History (1999).
