= Ayla Karacabey =

Turkish architect and professor

Ayla Karacabey Chatfield
- Born: 1939; Turkey
- Died: 2012 (aged 72–73)
- Education: American College for Girls (B.Sc., 1954); Vassar College (AB, 1956); Harvard University (M.Arch, 1960); Columbia University (M.Phil)
- Occupation: Architect

Ayla Karacabey Chatfield (1939–2012) was a Turkish architect who practiced in the United States. She worked with Marcel Breuer, Edward L. Barnes Associates, and finally, her own private practice. She is known for her work and research into the field of urban design.

== Personal life and education ==
Karacabey was born in Bursa Province, Turkey in 1939.

The government of Turkey was more progressive than previously, which gave women the opportunity to attend higher education. This allowed Karacabey to complete a Bachelor of Science degree with honors from Istanbul's American College for Girls in 1954. Since the courses were taught in English, Karacabey was able to attend Vassar College, where she received a Bachelor of Arts in art history in 1956. She was then admitted to the Graduate School of Design at Harvard University, where she completed a Master of Architecture in Urban Design degree in 1960. While at Harvard, the term urban design was used for the first time in the architecture school's curriculum, which she later discussed in a 1961 article for the Alumnae and Alumni of Vassar College Bulletin. In 1973 she received a Master of Philosophy in Architecture, Architectural Technology, and Urban Planning from Columbia University.

Karacabey died in 2012 in Istanbul, Turkey.

== Career ==
Karacabey's first job post university was at Marcel Breuer associates, where she worked from 1960 to 1962. Breuer, the designer of the Wassily chair amongst others, was an emigree of the Bauhaus and can be seen as Karacabey's role model in her professional life. She absorbed many of his ideas such as modernism, vernacular architecture, and regionalism. Karacebey worked on a ski resort in Chamonix during her time there. Following her time at Marcel Breuer, Karacabey worked at Edward L. Barnes associates from 1962 to 1967, then the Architects Design Group of New York in 1967 and 1968.

In 1968, Karacebey started her own firm. Some of her projects included the Student Union at the University of Florida, a speculative design for a resort town in Turkey, and the Esmerelda Resort Condominiums. Her work is strongly rooted in her education at Harvard and her modernist mentor Breuer.

After returning to Turkey, Karacebey taught at Yeditepe University from 2005 to 2012.

== Selected works ==
=== Esmeralda Resort Condominiums ===
Esmeralda Resort Condominiums is a resort village for international clients in Marbella, Spain. Karacabey and her fellows crafted a synthesis of architectural and town planning principles inspired by the site's topography, modular systems and local vocabulary. The design efficiently utilized space by stacking units and repurposing rooftops as patios. Public spaces and services were strategically positioned on flatter terrain, while the housing blocks were modular in nature, harmoniously grouped amidst green spaces, and adaptable in arrangement. The project artfully incorporated local materials and construction techniques, reflecting the region's distinct identity and cost-effectiveness. Karacabey's architectural expertise facilitated a fusion of modernism and tradition, culminating in a cohesive urban blueprint perfectly attuned to the local environment.

==== Ski Resort Town ====
The project was designed by Marcel Breuer and Associates in France in 1962, during Karacabey's tenure at the firm. This project presented a comprehensive integration of environmental, social, and economic considerations. It involved working with the natural landscape, adapting to climatic conditions, optimizing transportation systems, carefully managing density, and incorporating mixed-use structures into the existing urban fabric. The objective was to establish a cohesive community for the ski resort town, while also ensuring its economic sustainability.

== Honors ==
In 1971, Karacabey was named one of the top 40 women to have attended the Harvard University Graduate School of Design.
