= Johnston Marklee & Associates =

Architecture firm in Los Angeles, California

Johnston Marklee & Associates, is an architecture firm in Los Angeles, California founded by Sharon Johnston and her husband Mark Lee in 1998.

They are known for their "subtle" and "quietly innovative" approach to modern design. The firm was listed in the 2019 AD100 list of top architects and designers by Architectural Digest, and was named the 2016 Oliver Fellows for Architecture & Design.

== See also ==
- List of architecture firms
