= Lily Song =

- Born: Lily Kyung Bin Song

Academic background
- Education: Massachusetts Institute of Technology, University of California, Los Angeles, and University of California, Berkeley
- Thesis: Race and place : green collar jobs and the movement for economic democracy in Los Angeles and Cleveland (2012)

Lily Song is (since 2021) Assistant Professor of Race, Social Justice, and the Built Environment, Northeastern University. She was previously a Lecturer at Harvard University's Graduate School of Design, in the Department of Urban Planning and Design. As an urban planner, Song's most known for her research in design and race, class, and gender in American cities, social equity, housing, sustainability, and transportation and her community organizing with the Asian American Drug Abuse Program (AADAP), where she fought against environmental injustices.

== Education ==
Song earned her Ph.D. in Urban and Regional Planning from Massachusetts Institute of Technology in 2012. Her dissertation Race and place : green collar jobs and the movement for economic democracy in Los Angeles and Cleveland focused on studying two community coalitions in Los Angeles and Cleveland working toward economic democracy, green-collar jobs, and racial inclusion.

She earned a Master of Arts in Urban Planning from University of California, Los Angeles (2007). She completed her undergraduate studies in 2002 with a Bachelor of Arts in Ethnic Studies and a Minor in Business from University of California, Berkeley.

Her early education was with California public schools.

== Career and Work ==
Song's research and thinking has contributed to the field around how investments in urban transportation may be having negative impacts on inequities of race and gender. At Harvard University, Song's research applies a social, political, and economic lens to urban issues such as: transportation, food markets and distribution, and building energy efficiency. Her work centers the historically marginalized and disenfranchised groups and communities with a lens on systemic issues to help influence transformative policy and planning practices. Song is also a senior researcher at Transforming Urban Transport-The Role of Political Leadership (TUT-POL).

Song was also a Provost Fellow at University College London where she studied the Indonesian government's work on leveraging urban informality to create a more inclusive economy.

Much of Song's career has been in academia and teaching. Prior to Harvard, Lily Song served as a Provost Fellow with University College London’s Department of Science, Technology, Engineering, and Public Policy.

She also has a number of publications including:

- "COVID-19 Response for a Just Transition" Medium (2020)
- "Teaching as Radical Hospitality" in Diana Lempel (ed) The Radical Hospitality Reader. (2019)
- "Women on wheels: Gender and cycling in Solo, Indonesia." (2018)
- "Planning with Urban Informality: A case for inclusion, co-production, and re-iteration." (2016)
- "Enabling transformative agency: community-based green economic and workforce development in LA and Cleveland." (2016)

Before urban planning, Song worked as a community organizer with the Asian American Drug Abuse Program (AADAP).
