= Maurice D. Kilbridge =

Maurice Dorney Kilbridge (1920–2003) was an American academic who served as Dean of the Harvard Graduate School of Design from 1969 to 1980.
