= Raimund Abraham =

Austrian architect (1933–2010)

- Born: Raimund Johann Abraham; July 23, 1933; Lienz, East Tyrol, Austria
- Died: March 4, 2010 (aged 76); Los Angeles, California, U.S.
- Education: Graz University of Technology
- Occupation: architect
- Buildings: Austrian Cultural Forum, New York

Raimund Johann Abraham (July 23, 1933 – March 4, 2010) was an Austrian architect.

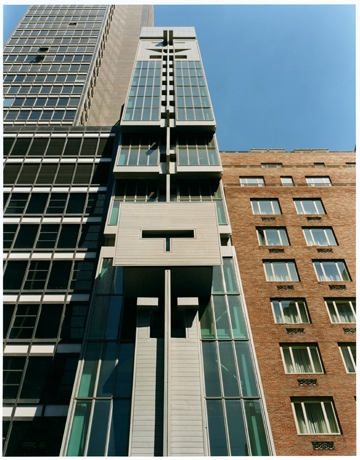
Austrian Cultural Forum New York ("ACFNY")

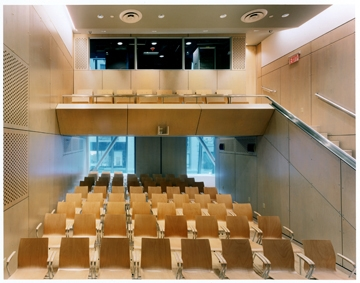
ACFNY auditorium

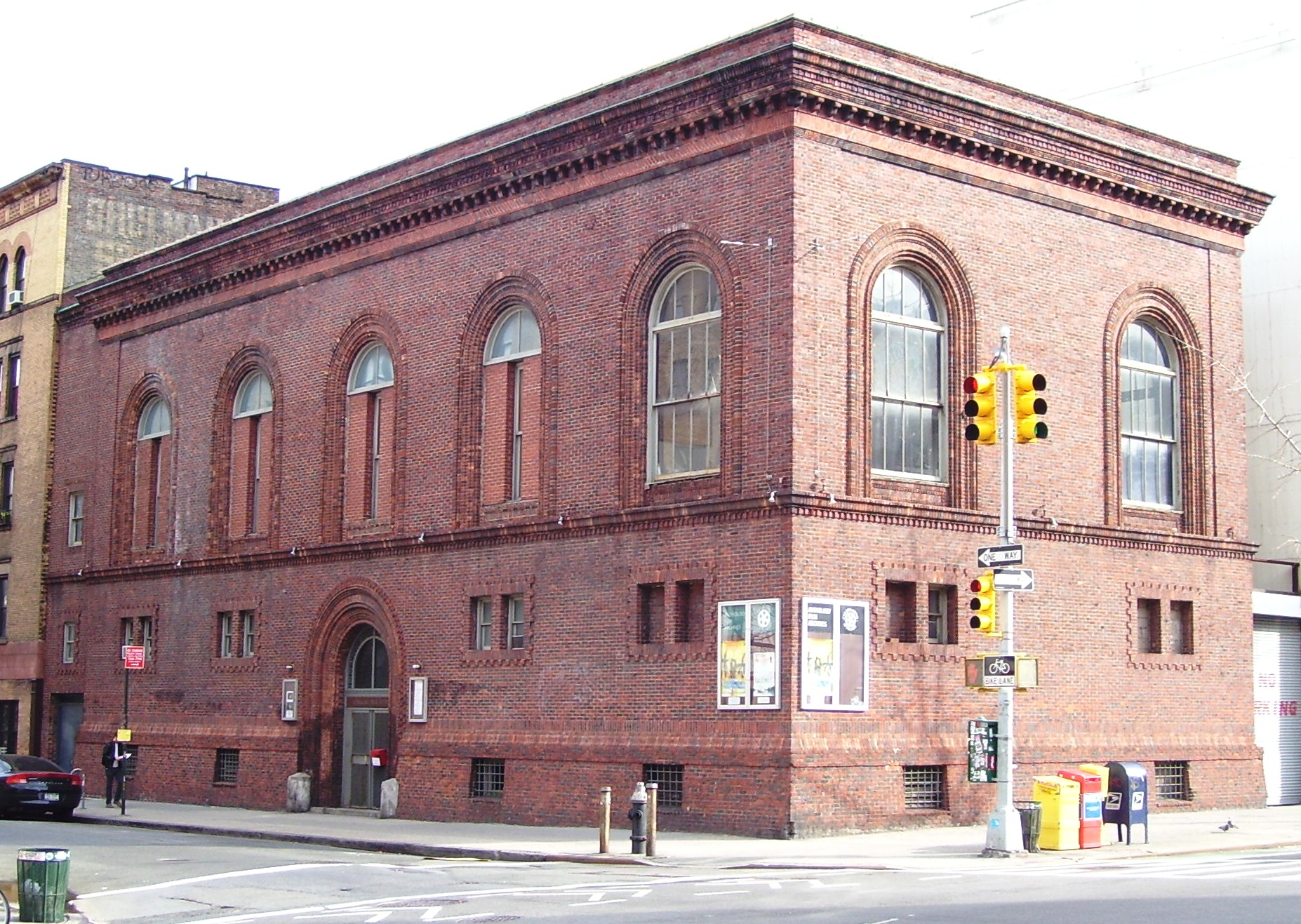
Anthology Film Archives

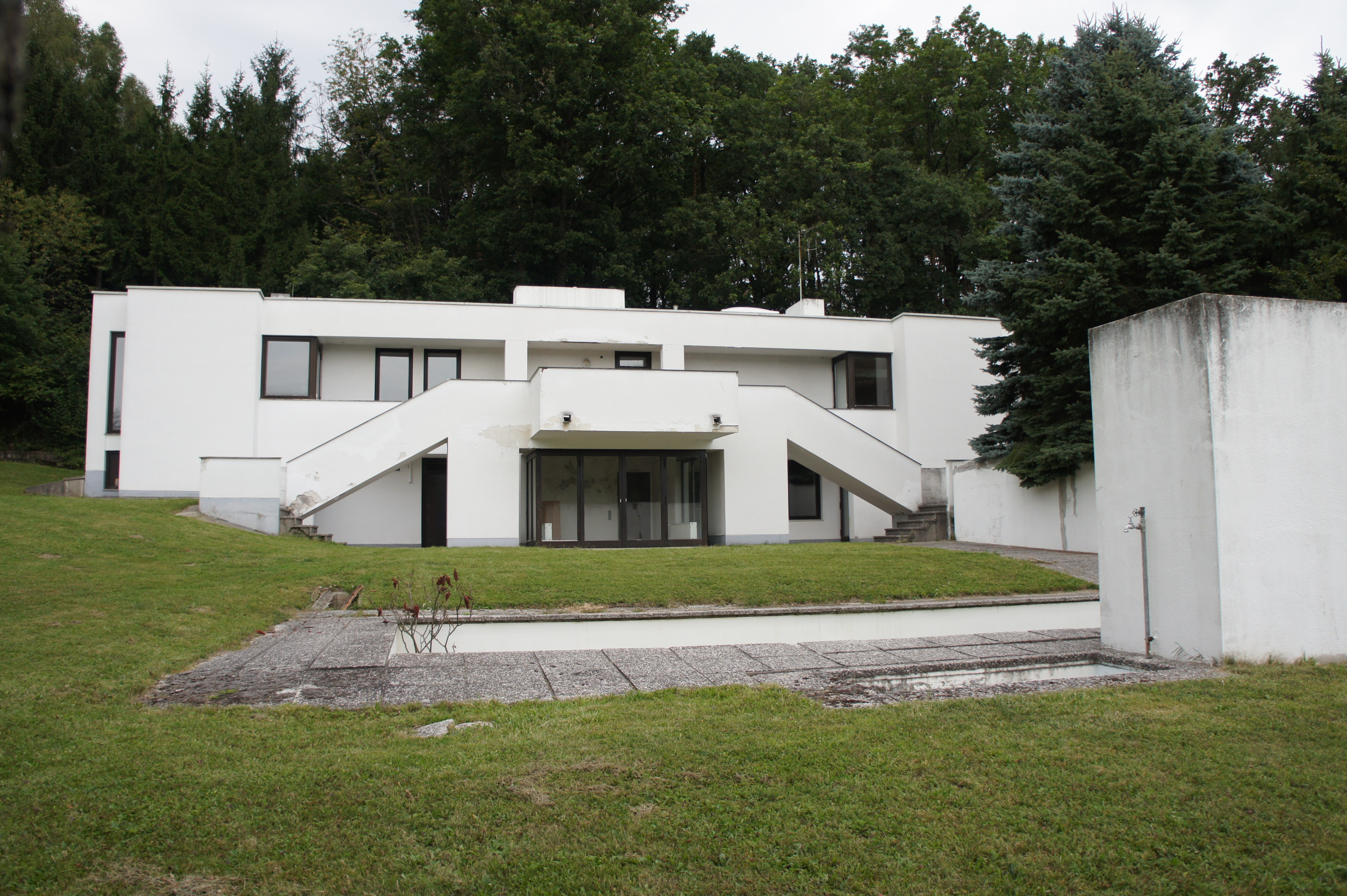
Oberwart Haus Dellacher

== Early life and formal education ==
Raimund Johann Abraham was born in 1933 in Lienz, East Tyrol, Austria. Throughout a 40-year career, Abraham created visionary projects and built works of architecture in Europe and in the United States. From 1952 to 1958, Abraham studied at the Graz University of Technology. In 1959, he established a studio in Vienna, where he explored the depths and boundaries of architecture through building, drawing, and montage. Abraham's first book, the 1965 publication "Elementare Architektur" was made at a time of transition between architecture studies and practice. In this early volume on elemental structures, Abraham explores the built environment, absent aesthetic speculation, and determinations about design instead coming from the relative level of knowledge and also the desires of the builder. In 1964, Abraham emigrated to the United States.

== Architecture career ==
Abraham was an influential architect in his native Austria and the New York avant-garde. Abraham's poetic architectural vision was influenced by the Viennese tradition to align architecture with sculpture, and also by the Austrian physicist and philosopher Ernst Mach. Abraham theorized architecture on a collision course with the needs of humans, yet striving for coexistence, in a constant state of creative tension. Beginning in the late 1950s, his enigmatic architecture placed Abraham among the avant-garde, such as Hans Hollein, Walter Pichler and Günther Domenig. In 1958, Abraham collaborated with Friedrich St. Florian, placing third in an international competition to design the Pan Arabian University of Saudi Arabia, and in 1959, placing second, for the design of the Democratic Republic of the Congo Cultural Center in Léopoldville. Abraham criticized mainstream architecture's preoccupation with style, its indifference to history, and the rigid definition of Modernism at that time. Abraham went on to influence generations of professional architects through architectural drawings, projects, and teaching.

A self-described incurable formalist, Abraham's notable built architecture includes House Dellacher (1963–67), in the Oberwart District of Burgenland, Austria, Public Housing Complex, (1968–69), and Experimental Kindergarten (1969-70) in Providence, Rhode Island. In 1973, Abraham was awarded the commission for Rainbow Plaza in Niagara Falls, New York, which he co-designed with Giuliano Fiorenzoli. The same year, Abraham was asked to transform the New Essex Market Courthouse building, located at 32 Second Avenue, New York City, for reuse as the Anthology Film Archives (1980–89), with collaborator-architects Kevin Bone and Joseph Levin. The portfolio Untitled marked the occasion.

In the mid-1980s, Abraham won the architecture competition to build a mixed-use residential and commercial complex, IBABERLIN, in Friedrichstraße 32-33 (1985–88), a major street in central Berlin, which forms the core of the Friedrichstadt neighborhood. The area was originally constructed to extend the city center, during the first half of the 18th century, in the Baroque style, and after significant damage during World War II, and then partly rebuilt before the division of the Berlin Wall. Abraham explained the work as a tribute to "a city of memories, hope and despair. A City mutilated and fragmented by war, offended through reconstruction and isolated by political manipulations. Historical fragments remain, monuments of the past, elements for a new architectural beginning. New elements are suggested. First independent, then connected to form a dialectical topography of urban Architecture."

Abraham contributed the design for Traviatagasse (1987-1991), in Vienna, with Carl Pruscha. Other buildings designed by Abraham include Residential/Commercial Building (1990–93), in Graz, Austria; House Bernard (1985), Hypo-Bank and Hypo-House (1993–96), situated in the historic center of the small town of Tyrol, in Lienz, Austria. In later years, Abraham designed his own home in Mazunte, Mexico.

Among Abraham's many well known hypothetical projects is Seven Gates to Eden, a bold hand-drawn analysis of the suburban house, exhibited in the 1976 Venice Biennale, curated by Francesco Dal Co, and included in a 1981 show at the Yale School of Architecture, entitled Collisions, curated by New York architect George Ranalli. Abraham's City Of Twofold Vision, Cannaregio West, (1978–80), is sited in Cannaregio, the northernmost of the six historic districts of the historic city of Venice, Italy. Abraham also designed the Les Halles Redevelopment project (1980) for Paris, France, and Interior (2001), and his design for The New Acropolis Museum (2002) in Athens, Greece articulates new ideas about the contextualization of monuments. In 2002, Abraham contributed a poetic artistic response to New York's World Trade Center attack on September 11, 2001. Abraham's proposal is a poignant symbol to regain footing while envisioning a new future architecture for the City of New York.

Perhaps Abraham's best known work of architecture is the Austrian Cultural Forum New York (1993-02), at 11 East 52nd Street; a building ingeniously arranged onto a site only 25 feet wide. Architectural historian Kenneth Frampton has recognized the Austrian Cultural Forum as "the most significant modern piece of architecture to be realized in Manhattan since the Seagram Building and Guggenheim Museum in 1959." Another notable project, Musikerhaus or House for Musicians (1999), in Hombroich, near to Düsseldorf, Germany. The built atop a former NATO missile base. Abraham adapted the site for reuse as an artists' residence and exhibition gallery. Abraham's Musikerhaus was completed posthumously, under the supervision of Abraham's daughter Una, in 2013. In 2015, The German Architecture Museum (DAM) identified Abraham's Musikerhaus as a significant new building constructed in Germany.

Abraham was awarded a Stone Lion (1985), at the 3rd International Architecture Exhibition for "Progetto Venezia," an international competition sponsored by the Venice Biennale, under the directorship of Aldo Rossi. He also earned the Grand Prize of Architecture (1995), and Gold Medal of Honor (2005) for meritorious service to the Province of Vienna.

In 2011, Abraham was part of the ensemble cast in the film "Sleepless nights stories," which included Marina Abramović, Thomas Boujut, Louise Bourgeois, Simon Bryant, Phong Bui, Pip Chodorov, Louis Garrel, Björk Gudmundsdottir, Flo Jacobs, Ken Jacobs, Harmony Korine, Lefty Korine, Rachel Korine-Simon, Kris Kucinskas, Hopi Lebel, Jean-Jacques Lebel, Diane Lewis, Jonas Lozoraitis, Adolfas Mekas, Oona Mekas, Sebastian Mekas, DoDo Jin Ming, Dalius Naujokaitis, Benn Northover, Hans Ulrich Obrist, Yoko Ono, Nathalie Provosty, Carolee Schneeman, Patti Smith, and Lee Stringer. The March 22, 2015 premiere of Scenes from the Life of Raimund Abraham (2013), by film diarist Jonas Mekas, is a cinéma vérité style documentary of the lift of Raimund Abraham which carries its subject, the visionary architect, into the future.

== Drawing architecture ==
Abraham's article entitled ''The Meaning of Place in Art and Architecture", published in 1983 refutes the opposition of Art and Architecture. Abraham is known for creating visionary architectural hand-drawings dominated by the elemental and archaic described in a few basic shapes. Throughout his career, Abraham asserted the autonomous, fundamental value of a drawing as a manifestation of architecture, stating, "The drawing is one of the tools we have available for the realization of an architectural idea." To Abraham, drawing was as much the work of the architect as building. Critics describe Abraham's drawings as architectural poetry on paper. Many of his visionary drawings are exhibited and collected as fine art.

During the 1960s and 70s, Abraham's interest in the typology of the house inspired masterful, visually compelling, imaginative architectural drawings, accompanied by evocative titles and texts, such as Glacier City, from the Linear City Series Project, Sectional perspective (1964) - an invisible city, between walls, on either side of a wide valley; Universal City, project, Sectional perspective (1966); Earth-Cloud House, project (1970); and The House with Curtains Project, Perspective (1972), about which Abraham notes, in the accompanying poem entitled "Elements of the House," the opposing sensations and feelings, natural elements and cycles, and spatial components characterizing his subject,The House without Rooms, project, elevation and plan (1974). Abraham's drawn architecture explores human dwellings, the ritual of habitation, and the subjectivity of spatial conditions, especially interiority. Abraham's shadowy visions, such as Radar Cities, Terza Mostra d' Architettura, (1985); Jewish Museum Project, Judenplatz, Vienna, Austria Project, Exterior perspective (1997); and Metropolitan Core (2010) propose thoughtful architectural prototypes. The work is a prescient meditation on architectural scale, not only its relationship to the scale of the human body, but also the impact of scale upon multi-sensory perception and imagination.

Abraham explained the inspiration for Nine Projects for Venice (1979–80): "the absence of the mechanical scale of land-bound transportation, Venice, as no other City, has been able to retain a physiological morphology which has consistently reversed all known spatial principles of Cartesian origins." Abraham populates the city of Venice with architectural inventions, such as Wall of Lost Journeys, House For Boats, Square of Solitude, and Tower of Wisdom. Abraham's drawn architecture is symbolic of the mythology for collisions and the potential of architectural expression. In the collection Reynolda House Museum of American Art, Abraham's Untitled (1982) drawing of a geometric structure set in a hilly landscape; along the edge is composed (from top to bottom) of an isometric view, a side elevation, and cross-section.

== Architecture education ==
Abraham explained his role as an educator as follows: "Teaching forces me to engage in a critical dialogue with somebody else, and find a level of objectivity that allows me to have a fair critical argument. My role as a teacher is simply to clarify, although that's a bit simplistic. When I give a problem to the students, it's my problem; I am trying to anticipate how I could solve that problem. And my joy is when the students come up with a solution I haven't thought of."

After arriving in the United States in the mid-1960s, Abraham taught at Rhode Island School of Design, in Providence, Rhode Island, and then for 31-years, he was a professor of architecture at the Cooper Union School of Art and Architecture, New York, N.Y., and adjunct faculty member at Pratt Institute, Brooklyn, New York. Abraham was also variously a visiting professor in architecture design at the Open Atelier of Design and Architecture (OADA) in New York City; Hines College of Architecture at the University of Houston, Texas; Yale School of Architecture and Environmental Studies; Harvard Graduate School of Design; Architectural Association School of Architecture, London; Southern California Institute of Architecture (SCI-Arc), Los Angeles, California; Technical Universities, Graz; and University of Strasbourg.

== Exhibitions ==
The work of Raimund Abraham has been exhibited widely at museums and galleries worldwide, including Moderna Museet, Stockholm, Sweden; Museo Correr, Venice, Italy; Centre Pompidou, Paris, France; Pinacotheca, Athens, Greece; National Gallery (Berlin); Venice Biennale; German Architecture Museum, Frankfurt; Krinzinger Gallery, Innsbruck; Graham Foundation for Advanced Studies in the Fine Arts of Chicago, Illinois; and the Museum of Modern Art and Architectural League of New York.

=== Solo exhibitions and programs ===
- 2016: Back Home: The architecture of Raimund Abraham retrospective. Schloss Bruck Museum, Lienz
- 2015: Scenes from the Life of Raimund Abraham (2013). Copenhagen Architecture Festival (CAFx) Premiere; Copenhagen, Denmark.
- 2011: Raimund Abraham "Musikerhaus Cooper Union School of Art and Architecture, New York, N.Y.
- 2006: Under Pain of Death. Austrian Cultural Forum New York
- 2005: Raimund Abraham: Jing Ya Ocean Entertainment Center. Frederieke Taylor Gallery, New York, N.Y.
- 2001: Raimund Abraham: Buildings, images 1990–2000. Aam Gallery, 9 Via Castelfidaro, Milan, Italy.
- 1993: The New Austrian Cultural Institute by Raimund Abraham. The Museum of Modern Art, New York.
- 1993: The New Austrian Cultural Institute. Architectural League of New York, Urban Center.
- 1991: Raimund Abraham: [UN]BUILT, 1961–1995. Arthur A. Houghton Jr. Gallery, Cooper Union School of Art and Architecture, New York, N.Y.
- 1987: Raimund Abraham: [UN]BUILT. Gallery Krinzinger, Galerie Museum, Innsbruck, Switzerland.
- 1983: Raimund Abraham: works and projects, 1960–1983 (Raimund Abraham : obras y proyectos, 1960-1983). Museo de Arte Moderno (Madrid), Escuela T.S. de Arquitectura de Madrid and Technical University of Madrid.
- 1983: Raimund Abraham Berlin Projects 1980 – 1983. Aedes, Galerie fur Architektur und Raum, Berlin, Germany.
- 1981: Raimund Abraham, Collisions: Exhibition, October 26 - December 4, 1981. Yale School of Architecture, New Haven, CT.
- 1976: Raimund Abraham: Seven Gates to Eden. Art Net, 14 West Central Street, London, England.
- 1975: Raimund Abraham: la casa, universo del hombre, (House, universe of man). Galería Universitaria Aristos, Royal and Pontifical University of Mexico (UNAM).
- 1973: Raimund Abraham: Works, 1960–1973. Galerie Grünangergasse 12,1010 Wien, Austria.
- 1969: Zero Zones. Moderna Museet (Modern Museum), Stockholm, Sweden.
- 1969: Raimund Abraham: Hyperspaces. Architectural League of New York.

=== Group exhibitions ===
- 2015: Endless House: Intersections of Art and Architecture. Museum of Modern Art, New York, N.Y.
- 2012: Vienna e dintorni: Raimund Abraham, Hans Hollein, Max Peintner, Gianni Pettena, Walter Pichler, Ettore Sottsass. Galleria Giovanni Bonelli, Milan, Italy.
- 2012: White Cube, Green Maze: New Art Landscapes. Carnegie Museum of Art, Pittsburgh, Pennsylvania.
- 2008: Dreamland: Architectural Experiments Since the 1970s.
- 2004: Ex. Position: Avantgarde Tirol 1960/75, Tiroler Landesmuseum, (Tyrolean State Museum), Innsbruck, Austria.
- 2004: Hombroich spaceplacelab: Laboratory for other modes of living, 9: 1 = landscape: building. International Exhibition of Architecture, Exhibition Palazzo Zenobio, Venice, Italy.
- 2003: Global village: The 1960s. Dallas Museum of Art (DMA), Dallas, Texas.
- 2003: Civilization of living: The evolution of European domestic interiors, travel exhibition held first at La Triennale di Milano.
- 2002: A new World Trade Center: Design proposals from leading architects worldwide, Max Protetch Gallery, New York City.
- 1999: The Architecture of the Austrian Cultural Forum New York. AZW Exhibition, Vienna, Austria.
- 1996: Hombroich Architecture. The 6th International Exhibition of Architecture, Palazzo Vendramin, Venice, Italy.
- 1996: Planes. Petrie Great Hall and Joseph Gallery of the Hebrew Union College-Jewish Institute of Religion, New York, N.Y.
- 1991: 13 Austrian positions. Fifth International Exhibition of Architecture, Venice Biennale.
- 1985: Architecture Biennale, Venice, Italy
- 1984: Follies: Landscape architecture for the late twentieth century. Leo Castelli Gallery, New York; James Corcoran Gallery, Los Angeles; MOPU Arquitectura, Madrid.
- 1984: Times Square Tower Project, New York, N.Y. Municipal Art Society, New York, N.Y.
- 1983: Trends in contemporary architecture. National Gallery Alexander Soutzos Museum, Greece.
- 1981: Inventions: Piranesi and architectural fantasies in the present; December 13, 1981 – February 10, 1982, Kunstverein Hannover, German Werkbund Lower Saxony and Bremen.
- 1980: Ten images for Venice: Raimund Abraham, Carlo Aymonino, Peter Eisenman, John Hejduk, Bernhard Hoesli, Rafael Moneo, Valeriano Pastor, Gianugo Polesello, Aldo Rossi, Luciano Semerani; Our projects for Cannaregio West, Venice; Napoleonic Wing, April 1st – 30th April 1980. Museo Correr, Venice, Italy.
- 1979: Visionary drawings of architecture and planning: 20th century through the 1960s. Smithsonian Institution, Traveling Exhibition Service (SITES).
- 1978: Architecture: Seven Architects. Institute of Contemporary Art of the University of Pennsylvania.
- 1977: Architecture: 7 Architects: Raimund Abraham, Emilio Ambasz, Richard Meier, Walter Pichler, Aldo Rossi, James Stirling, Robert Venturi and John Rauch). Leo Castelli Gallery, New York City.
- 1976: Seven Gates to Eden: Studio in Venice (hommage to Franco della Puppa). Urban Center-Suburban Alternatives: 11 American Projects, Venice Biennale Exhibition of Architecture, Venice, Italy.
- 1967: Architectural Fantasies: Drawings from the Museum's Collection. Museum of Modern Art, New York City.
