= House Dellacher =

Coordinates: 47.2791°N 16.1716°E

The House Dellacher is a residential building in Oberwart, Burgenland, Austria and a registered historic landmark.

It was built between 1965 and 1969 by architect Raimund Abraham for a friend, photographer Max Dellacher. The design follows the traditional regional style with arcades and white facades, but incorporates other influences as well. The dining room avoids the view outside and instead is only lit by a skylight in a reference to Japanese teahouses. There can also be similarities found to Adolf Loos in the wood-paneled niches. The house is designed as a monolith that drifts apart in the middle and in that process creating niches openings as windows.

The house was sold in August 2015 to Johannes Handler, who, after an extensive renovation, will open it to the public coming spring 2017. Public events and tours will be managed by the society "Das Dellacher".
