= Kilbourn Tower =

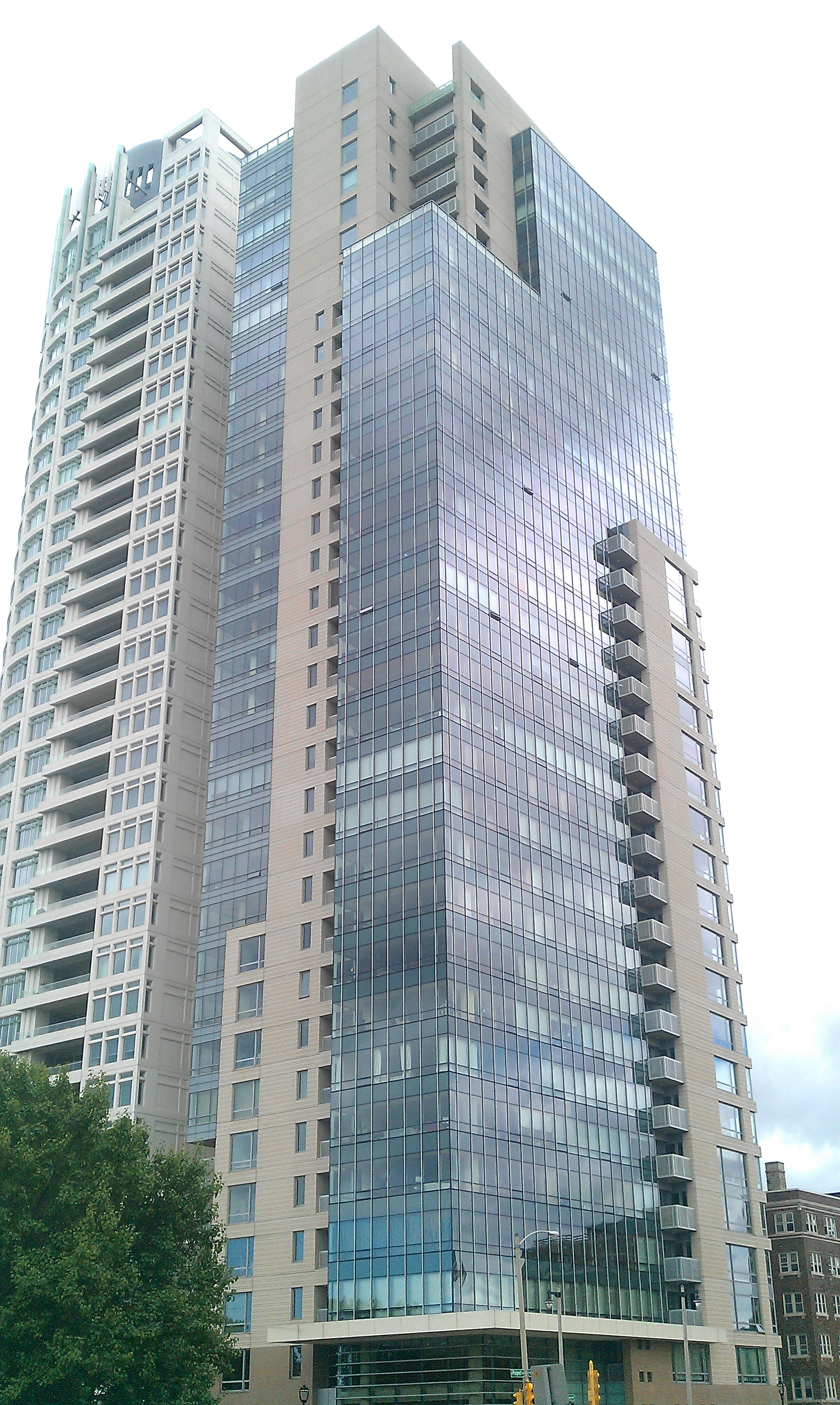
- From the northeast with the University Club Tower to the left
- Interactive map of the Kilbourn Tower area

General information
- Type: Skyscraper
- Architectural style: Modern
- Location: Milwaukee, Wisconsin, USA, 923 East Kilbourn Avenue
- Coordinates: 43°2′33.33″N 87°53′58.65″W
- Construction started: July 2003
- Completed: July 2005

Height
- Height: 380 feet (120 m)

Technical details
- Floor count: 33

Design and construction
- Architecture firm: La Dallman Architects Inc.

Other information
- Public transit access: MCTS

The Kilbourn Tower is a 33-story, 380-foot-tall (120 m) condominium tower in Milwaukee, Wisconsin. The building was completed in 2005, and at the time of its completion, it was the tallest residential building in Wisconsin. It would be surpassed by the University Club Tower the following year. The building is located at 923 E. Kilbourn Street.

== History ==
The Kilbourn Tower was originally conceived by New Land Enterprises, however, a decision to change developers led to Fiduciary Real Estate becoming the new head of the project. It is designed by LA DALLMAN, the architecture practice of Grace La and James Dallman and built in a modernist style. At the time of its construction in 2006, Kilbourn Tower was considered the 5th tallest building designed by a woman. The project cost an estimated $70 million.

== See also ==
- List of tallest buildings in Milwaukee
