= Michele Michahelles =

Italian and Swiss architect

Michele Michahelles (b. Italy, 1936) is an Italian and Swiss architect, best known for his work in Paris with MBA, the Marcel Breuer and Associates practice.

Michahelles was born in Florence into a prestigious artistic family that included the American sculptor Hiram Powers, painter Ruggero Michahelles, the Futurist designer and visionary Ernesto Michahelles (better known by his pseudonym "Thayaht"), as well as the portrait painter Assia Busiri-Vici. Trained as an agronomist, he left Italy to pursue architecture at the Harvard Graduate School of Design. His father, Dr. Marco Michahelles, was the leading wheat geneticist in Italy and other Countries.

He was in charge of the restoration of Les Invalides in Paris, as the assistant to the Chief Architect for Historic Monuments B. Monnet. For the Paris Municipality he was responsible for the landscaping of the Esplanade des Invalides as well as the Jardin de l'Intendant. For the Ministry of Veterans he renovated with F. Monnet the INI Hospital – Institution National des Invalides. For the Ministry of Finance, he won the competition for the "Hotel des Impots" of Martinique, with F. Monnet.

In 1983 Michele Michahelles joined MBA, Marcel Breuer Associates, as a partner. He was responsible, with his partner Mario Jossa, for the urban development project of IBM's Essonne site (90 Ha), for the IBM Advance Bipolar Line production centre in France, and for a number of office buildings in La Defense – Paris totalling 130,000 m2. He won the competition for the Indosuez Bank Headquarters in Paris, 65,000 sqm2, and the competition for the Office and Manufacturing Complex for Sumitomo Sitix in Mante-la-Jolie, France. He created MBA Moscow, where with the Russian architect N. Belousov, he won the competition for the development of Moscow's Central District Yakimmnka. 75,000 sqm

Michele Michahelles was the founder of TDC, New York, Transportation Designers Corporation, a stock company devoted to proposing multimediality in mass transportation. He was granted a US Patent for the Intermodal Passenger Transportation System, where cars of innovative engineering can be integrated to intermodal trains and architectural spaces, producing important improvements in fuel consumption. safety and travel comfort.

Michele Michahelles works now in Italy, where he was involved in the touristic development project of the Filicudi an island in Sicily's Aeolian archipelago, and is now active in projects of restoration of country estates and the development of tourist compounds. Michahelles has led projects worldwide, in regions ranging from the Middle East to the Soviet Union. He has also lectured on architectural theory and practice, teaching at Parsons School of Design in Paris,

== Sources ==
- http://www.michahelles.eu
- Le Moniteur des Travaux Publiques. Supplement au n° 36/8/9/80
- Industriels pour l'Architecture,1990
- AC Moscow, n°3, 1995
- Metall, 10 May 1991, n°8
- Delovie Lyudi, Feb 1994

https://www.linkedin.com/pub/dir/Nikolay/Belousov

- http://www.michahelles.net
- http://www.maremaremma.net
