= Sharon Johnston (architect) =

American architect and architecture critic

Sharon Johnston is an American architect and architecture critic. She is a founding partner of the firm Johnston Marklee & Associates based in Los Angeles.

Johnston has taught at a number of universities including Harvard Graduate School of Design, Princeton University, the University of California, Los Angeles, and has held the Cullinan Chair at Rice University and the Frank Gehry International Chair at the University of Toronto. In 2015, Johnston was named a Fellow of the American Institute of Architects for her contributions to the field.

== Education ==
- Harvard University, Graduate School of Design Master of Architecture 1995
- Stanford University Bachelor of History
