= Elizabeth Whittaker =

Award-winning female American architect known for innovative design

Elizabeth Whittaker is an American architect, designer and educator based in Boston, Massachusetts. She is the founder of Merge Architects in Boston and Associate Professor in Practice of Architecture at the Graduate School of Design at Harvard University.

== Career ==
After graduating cum laude from North Carolina State University with a degree in Environmental Design in Architecture, Whittaker received her Master of Architecture with Distinction from Harvard University's Graduate School of Design in 1999.

In 2003 Whittaker founded Merge Architects, an architectural practice whose work spans many typologies including residential, commercial and institutional projects, and particularly extensive experience with multi-family housing, commercial interiors and universities. The work of Merge Architects focuses on Contemporary Craft, Typological Transformations, and Social Ecologies in the built environment.

Whittaker currently serves as Associate Professor in Practice of Architecture at Harvard University's Graduate School of Design, where she has taught since 2009. She has also taught design studios at the Massachusetts Institute of Technology (MIT), Northeastern University and the Boston Architectural College.

Whittaker has served on numerous professional design juries for the American Institute of Architects (AIA) and as an invited juror in dozens of academic institutions worldwide. She frequently lectures both in the US and internationally. Since 2021 she has served on the Overseas Building Operations Industry Advisory Group (OBO/IAG) of the United States Department of State.

== Recognition ==
While a graduate student at Harvard's Graduate School of Design, Whittaker won the Araldo A. Cossutta Prize/core studio prize, the Faculty Design Award, and the John E. Thayer Award for overall academic achievement. In 2017 she was named Architectural Record's "New Generation Leader" as part of their "Women in Architecture Awards" event, an honor that recognizes one top female architect in the United States each year. In 2015 she was honored with the AIA Young Architects Award and also in 2015 she earned one of the most coveted awards in North American architecture, one of the eight Emerging Voices Awards from the Architectural League of New York, together with her firm Merge Architects. In 2025 Whittaker's Merge Architects won Architizer's Popular Choice Award for Top Medium Architecture Firm in the World, in addition to being named by the jury as one the top five medium size firms in the world and top 100 architecture firms in the United States in the magazine's annual A+ Awards. Additionally in 2025, Whittaker and Merge Architects won the top Honor Award at the Boston Society of Architects BSA Design Excellence Awards in the Housing Category for the Jackson Hole Workforce Housing project. Whittaker's leadership has also been recognized through service on the Boston Society of Architects (BSA)/AIA Board of Directors, the BSA/AIA Rotch Traveling Fellowship Committee and the BSA/AIA Nominating Committee.
