= Peter G. Rowe =

New Zealand-born educator and architect

- Born: Peter G. Rowe
- Education: University of Melbourne (BArch); Rice University (MArch in urban design), Harvard University (AM Hon)
- Occupations: professor Architect
- Practice: SURBA – Studio for Urban Analysis

Peter G. Rowe is an architect, researcher, author, and educator. Rowe is currently the Raymond Garbe Professor of Architecture and Urban Design and the Harvard Distinguished Service Professor at the Harvard University Graduate School of Design, where he has held various teaching positions since 1985. He is also the chairman and co-founder of the New York-based practice SURBA – Studio for Urban Analysis, founded in 2012.

== Education ==
He received his Bachelor of Architecture (BArch) degree from Melbourne University in 1969 and later pursued a Master of Architecture in Urban Design (MArch) from Rice University in 1971. Rowe was awarded an honorary Master of Arts (AM) degree from Harvard University in 1986. In recognition of his work, Melbourne University conferred upon him an honorary Doctor of Architecture degree in 2013.

== Career ==
Rowe served as the director of the School of Architecture at Rice University from 1981 to 1985, where he had taught since 1971. While at Rice, he directed numerous multi-disciplinary research projects through the Rice Center, where he was vice president from 1978 onwards, and at the Southwest Center for Urban Research. Since 1985, Rowe has taught and held leadership positions at the Harvard University Graduate School of Design, where he served as Dean from 1992 to 2004, Chairman of the Urban Planning and Design Department from 1988 until 1992, and Director of the Urban Design Programs from 1985 until 1990. He is also an Honorary Professor at several Chinese universities and an honorand of the Academia dei Benigni, Italy (2002); and an Honorary Professor at Tsinghua University (2018–present) and at the Xian University of Architecture and Technology (1999–present).

His current practice, SURBA-Studio for Urban Analysis, is an urban research firm and think-tank co-founded with Carlos Arnaiz in 2012. Based in Brooklyn, New York, the studio focuses on exploring urbanization at various scales, particularly in developing countries. In 2020, Rowe and Arnaiz published When Urbanization Comes to Ground, a book of essays reflecting on SURBA's work exploring urbanization in China, Colombia, and the Philippines. Between 1981 and 1987, Rowe also spent significant time in professional practice as Principal at Environmental Planning and Design (EplDes) in Houston, Texas.

At EplDes, Rowe was involved in a number of significant projects working with urban modeling, growth forecasting, environmental impact assessment, urban design and planning, and public policy evaluation.

== Selected publications ==
- Rowe, Peter G. (1979). Urban Watershed Management: Flooding and Water Quality. Rice University. ISBN 978-0892632404.
- Rowe, Peter G. (1994). Design thinking (5th print ed.). Cambridge, Mass. London: MIT Press. ISBN 978-0-262-68067-7.
- Rowe, Peter G. (1991). Making a middle landscape. Cambridge, Massachusetts: MIT Press. ISBN 978-0-262-68077-6.
- Rowe, Peter G. (1995). Modernity and housing. Cambridge, Mass: MIT Press. ISBN 978-0-262-18151-8.
- Rowe, Peter G.; Fu, Yun; Song, Jihoon (2021). Korean modern: the matter of identity: an exploration into modern architecture in an East Asian country. Basel: Birkhäuser. ISBN 978-3-0356-2261-4. OCLC 1265562757.
- Rowe, Peter G.; Fu, Yun (2022). Southeast Asian modern: from roots to contemporary turns. Basel: Birkhäuser. ISBN 978-3-0356-2457-1.
- Lü, Jun hua; Rowe, Peter G.; Zhang, Jie (2001). Modern urban housing in China, 1840-2000. Munich London New York: Prestel. ISBN 978-3-7913-2507-1.
- Rowe, Peter G.; Kan, Har Ye, eds. (2014). Urban Intensities: Contemporary Housing Types and Territories. Place of publication not identified: De Gruyter. ISBN 978-3-03821-477-9.
- Rowe, Peter G.; van den Berg, Hanne J.; Liang, Wang (2019). Urban Blocks and Grids: History, Technical Features, and Outcomes. Scholars' Press. p. 188. ISBN 978-6138916673.
- Rowe, Peter G. (2019). A City in Blue and Green: The Singapore Story (1st ed.). Singapore: Springer Singapore Pte. Limited. doi:10.1007/978-981-13-9597-0. ISBN 978-981-13-9596-3.
- Rowe, Peter G.; Pasini, Roberto; Ortiz Silva, Patricio; García González, Carlos; Centro Roberto Garza Sada de Arte, Arquitectura y Diseño, eds. (2020). Ríó ciudad Monterrey: space production, ecology and culture = producción espacial, ecología y cultura: a study directed by Peter G. Rowe with Roberto Pasini and Patricio Ortiz Silva at the Centro Roberto Garza Sada de Arte, Arquitectura y Diseño, Universidad de Monterrey. Melfi, Italy: Casa Editrice Libria. ISBN 978-88-6764-177-2. OCLC 1124924271.
- Rowe, Peter G.; Wang, Liang; Chen, Zhanliang (2022). Chinese modern: episodes backwards and forwards in time. Basel: Birkhäuser. ISBN 978-3-0356-2630-8.
- Rowe, Peter G.; Chung, Yoeun (2024). Design Thinking and Storytelling in Architecture. Erscheinungsort nicht ermittelbar: De Gruyter. ISBN 978-3-0356-2811-1.

== Awards ==
Rowe is the recipient of numerous awards, including the Distinguished Alumni Award from Rice University in 2014 and the Picton Hopkins Prize in Design (1967) among others. He has also held several honorary professorships, including at Tsinghua University (2018–), Tongji University (2003), Xi-an University of Architecture and Technology (1999–) and the Chinese University of Hong Kong (2014–).
