= Murphy Warehouse Company =

Supply chain logistics company

- Type: Private
- Industry: Supply Chain Management
- Founded: 1904
- Headquarters: Minneapolis, Minnesota
- Key people: Kirk Fischer, CEO & President
- Website: www.murphylogistics.com

Murphy Warehouse Company is a family-owned, full-service supply chain logistics company based in Minneapolis, Minnesota. Founded in 1904, Murphy is one of the Upper Midwest's largest asset-based logistics companies.

The company provides a wide range of services, including warehousing, distribution, transportation, cross-docking, fulfillment and administrative, as well as international logistics through its Midwest International Logistics Center. Murphy is OSHA MNSHARP Certified and Safe Quality Food SQF Edition 9 Certified.

Kirk Fischer is CEO of the company.

== History ==
In 1904, founder Edward L. Murphy Sr. purchased two horses and a wagon from his brother, Jack, signifying the beginning of the Murphy Warehouse Company. As of 2019, Murphy operates 14 warehouse facilities in Minnesota and Missouri.

=== Stormwater management system ===
In 2008, Murphy Warehouse installed a stormwater management system at its headquarters. The system cost $580,000 to install, captures 95 percent of stormwater on a 22-acre (89,000 m^{2}) site that was more than 95 percent impervious, recharges groundwater, filters stormwater for quality, and eliminates a $68,000 annual stormwater assessment from the city. It is the first stormwater system of its kind to be voluntarily constructed on an existing, heavy use commercial site in Minneapolis, Minnesota.

Murphy also installed native prairies around the stormwater system, increasing its efficiency, eliminating polluting fertilization and water waste from automatic sprinklers, and saving additional money through reduced maintenance costs of a traditional lawn. For example, at Murphy's Fridley Campus, a similar installation requires $2,240 per year for 6 acres (24,000 m^{2}) of prairie upkeep instead of $21,650 per year for only four acres of lawn care.

In January 2009, the American Council of Engineering Companies recognized Murphy and Wenck Engineers, which assisted in design and installation, with the Minnesota Engineering Excellence Honor Award for the stormwater system.

== Products and services ==
Murphy provides warehousing, distribution, information management, contract logistics, consolidation, transportation, rail transloading, pool distribution, pick and pack, fulfillment, freight brokerage, and international support services. Murphy also provides other services such as, labeling, stretch wrapping, product assembly, packaging, re-pack, and quality control testing-sampling.

The company also offers international logistics through its Midwest International Logistics Center, which includes a designated U.S. Customs Exam Station (CES), a Container Freight Station (CFS) and a Foreign Trade Zone (FTZ), allowing for modifications to import products before they reach U.S. soil, as well as export services.
