= Preston Scott Cohen =

American architect

Preston Scott Cohen is a professor of Harvard Graduate School of Design (GSD). In 2004, he established a partnership with two registered architects, Amit Nemlich and Gilles Quintal, and became the Design Principal of Preston Scott Cohen, Inc. based in Central Square Cambridge, Massachusetts. Preston Scott Cohen, Inc. is renowned for the design of cultural, educational, commercial buildings and urban design projects around the world. Projects include the Sarmiento Performing Arts Center in Bogota, Colombia; a new building for Taubman College at the University of Michigan; the Taiyuan Museum of Art in Taiyuan, China; the Datong City Library; the Amir Building, Tel Aviv Museum of Art; and the Goldman Sachs Canopy in New York. The firm is also well known for non-profit projects including the Cape Rep Theater, Temple Beth El in Springfield, MA, and the Detroit Chabad. Cohen has received numerous honors including induction as an academician at the National Academy of Art, five Progressive Architecture Awards, first prizes for seven international competitions and an Academy Award from the American Academy of Arts and Letters. Cohen is the author of Lightfall (Skira Rizzoli, 2016), The Return of Nature (2015), Contested Symmetries (2001), and numerous theoretical essays on architecture. His work has been widely exhibited and is held in numerous museum collections.

== Academic career ==
Cohen received his Bachelor of Fine Arts and Bachelor of Architecture degrees from the Rhode Island School of Design in 1982 and 1983 (respectively). In 1985, he received his Master of Architecture degree from the Harvard GSD. Gaining professorship there in 2003, he also served as the Director of the Architecture degree program. In 2008, he was appointed Chair of the GSD, a position held previously by Rafael Moneo, Mack Scogin, Henry N. Cobb and Walter Gropius.

== Geometry in architecture ==
Cohen's design approach is based on the projective geometry of the 17th century, but he shows a novel application by using oblique projections. This approach is supported by computer modelling. The calculations are rapid, sometimes preprogramed, and the transformation from two dimensions to three is a complex procedure. Geometry is returned to its independent status after having served primarily the needs of technology during the industrialization of the West. It is no longer a tool for the production of machinery.

In the case of the Wu House, renderings of which have been collected by the San Francisco Museum of Modern Art, the curves are the intersections of cylindrical volumes. The spaces are three-dimensional images of geometrical operations. The vitality of the intersection lines reflects an idea of design which is far from the preconceived rules of the aesthetics that usually arise from these geometric forms.

== Tel Aviv Museum of Art ==
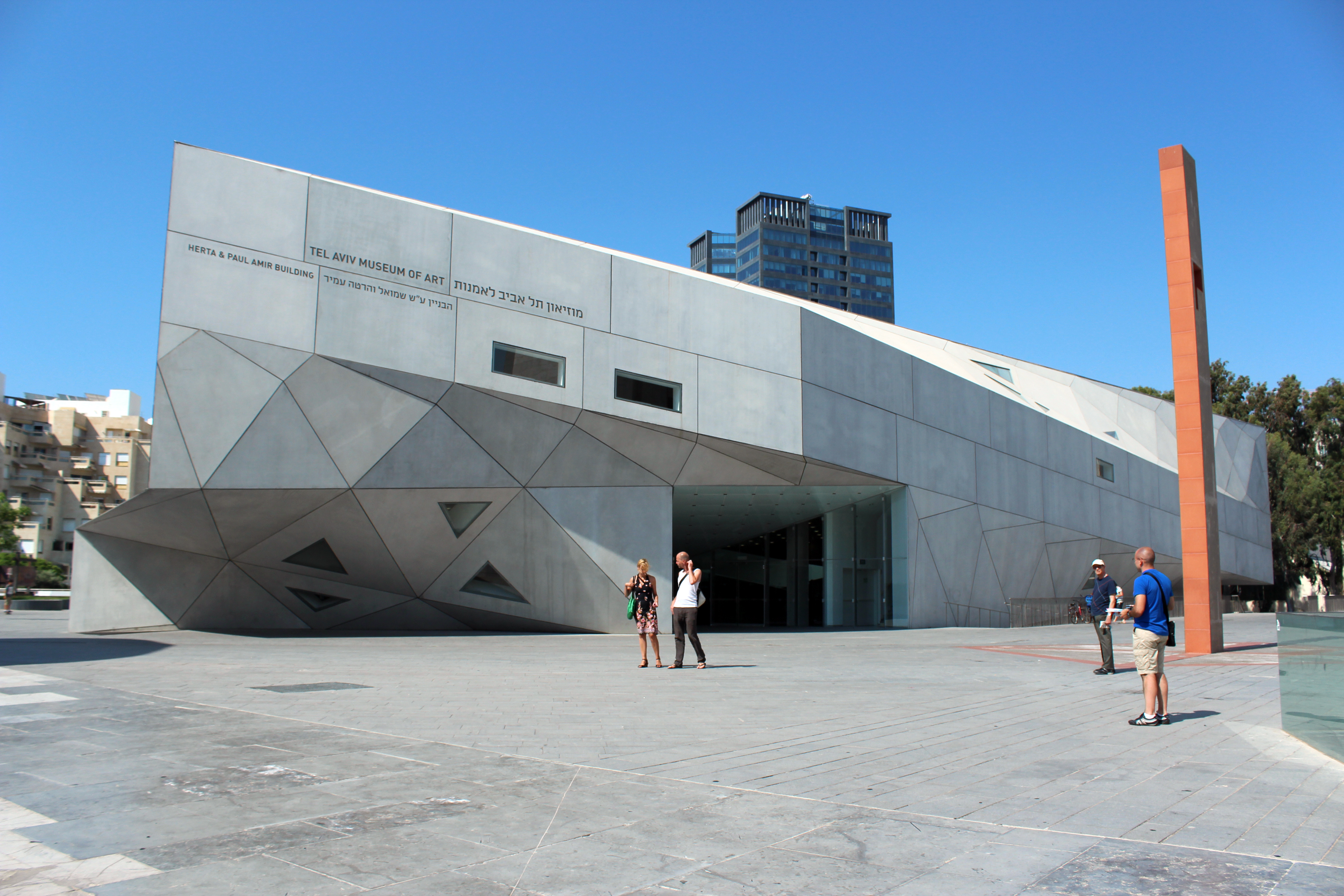
Herta and Paul Amir Building

In January 2004, Cohen was the winner of the Herta and Paul Amir Competition to design a new building for the Tel Aviv Museum of Art (estimated $45 million budget to build flexible gallery spaces, concessions, as well as the restoration of labs and offices). The building is noted for its hyperboloid form, and is to be finished with Israeli stone. Renderings of the project were shown at the Museum of Contemporary Art, Los Angeles in a 2006-2007 exhibition entitled Skin + Bones: parallel practices in fashion and architecture.

== Publications ==
- The 2001 monograph Contested Symmetries, The Architecture and Writings of Preston Scott Cohen, Princeton Architectural Press
- The Return of Nature, with Erika Naginski, 2014, Routledge
- Lightfall, 2016, Skira Rizzoli
- Peter Eisenman, Preston Scott Cohen et al., Peter Eisenman: In dialogue with architects and philosopher(Vladan Djokić and Petar Bojanić (eds.)), Mimesis International. 2017, ISBN 9788869771132
