= Harvard Graduate School of Design =

Architecture school of Harvard University

- Coat of arms
- Type: Private graduate school of design
- Established: 1874 (first courses taught); 1936 (GSD established)
- Parent institution: Harvard University
- Dean: Sarah Whiting
- Faculty: 206
- Students: 878; 362 (architecture); 161 (urban planning and design); 182 (landscape architecture); 173 (doctoral/design studies)
- Location: Cambridge, Massachusetts, U.S. 42.3758°N 71.1139°W
- Campus: Urban
- Website: gsd.harvard.edu

The Harvard Graduate School of Design (GSD) is the graduate school of design at Harvard University, a private Ivy League research university in Cambridge, Massachusetts. It offers master's and doctoral programs in architecture, landscape architecture, urban planning, urban design, real estate, design engineering, and design studies.

The GSD has over 13,000 alumni and has graduated many famous architects, urban planners, and landscape architects. The school is considered a global academic leader in design fields.

The GSD has the world's oldest landscape architecture program (founded in 1893) and North America's oldest urban planning program (founded in 1900). Architecture was first taught at Harvard University in 1874. The Graduate School of Design was officially established in 1936, combining the three fields of landscape architecture, urban planning, and architecture under one graduate school.

== History ==
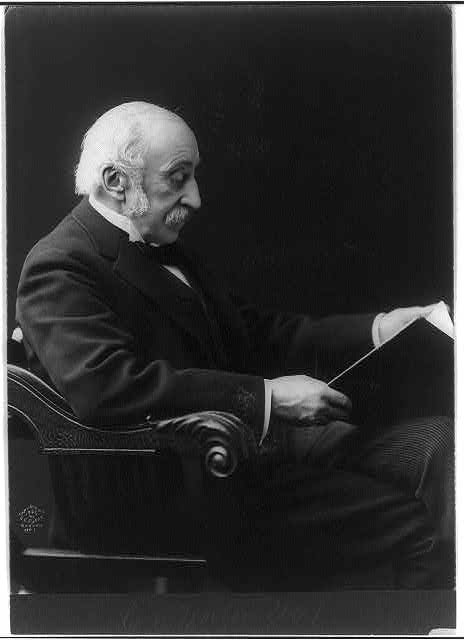
Charles Eliot Norton brought the first architecture courses to Harvard University in 1874

=== Architecture ===
Charles Eliot Norton brought the first architecture classes to Harvard University in 1874.

=== Landscape architecture ===
In 1893, the nation's first professional course in landscape architecture was offered at Harvard University. In 1900, the world's first landscape architecture program was established by Frederick Law Olmsted Jr. and Arthur A. Shurcliff. The School of Landscape Architecture was established in 1913. Lester Collins who studied there, graduating in 1942, became professor after World War II, and soon Dean of the course.

=== Urban planning and design ===
In 1900, the first urban planning courses were taught at Harvard University, and by 1909, urban planning courses taught by James Sturgis Pray were added to Harvard's design curriculum as part of the then School of Landscape Architecture. In 1923, a specialization in urban planning was established under the degree program of Master in Landscape Architecture. In 1929, North America's first urban planning degree (at the graduate level) was established at Harvard under short-term funding from the Rockefeller Foundation. The planning program migrated to the Graduate School of Design in 1936. Then in 1981, the then City and Regional Planning Program under John Kain ceased at the Graduate School of Design and was dispersed to the Kennedy School of Government and the Faculty of Arts and Sciences. In 1984, the Department of Urban Planning and Design was formed under Dean Gerald M. McCue with the inclusion of the Urban Design Program. Then in 1994, the Urban Planning program was officially returned to the Graduate School of Design under the aegis of Albert Carnesale, the Dean of the Kennedy School of Government, and Peter G. Rowe, the Dean of the Faculty of Design; with the first class entering in academic year 1994–1995. At the time, this program was envisioned as a physical planning program. In 2021, the Department of Urban Planning and Design assumed responsibility for a third graduate degree, the Master in Real Estate (MRE).

=== Establishment ===
The three major design professions (landscape architecture, urban planning, and architecture) were officially united in 1936 to form the Harvard Graduate School of Design. Joseph F. Hudnut (1886–1968) was an American architect scholar and professor who was the first dean. In 1937, Walter Gropius joined the GSD faculty as chair of the Department of Architecture and brought modern designers, including Marcel Breuer to help revamp the curriculum.

In 1960, Josep Lluís Sert established the nation's first Urban Design program. George Gund Hall, which is the present iconic home GSD, opened in 1972 and was designed by Australian architect and GSD graduate John Andrews. The school's now defunct Laboratory for Computer Graphics and Spatial Analysis (LCGSA) led by the Department of Landscape Architecture is widely recognized as the research/development environment from which the now-commercialized technology of geographic information systems (GIS) emerged in the late 1960s and 1970s. More recent research initiatives include the Design Robotics Group, a unit that investigates new material systems and fabrication technologies in the context of architectural design and construction.

=== Deans ===
Dean	Tenure	Career
Joseph Hudnut	1936–1953	Architect
Josep Lluís Sert	1953–1969	Architect and urban planner
Maurice D. Kilbridge	1969–1980	Urban planner
Gerald M. McCue	1980–1992	Architect
Peter G. Rowe	1992–2004	Architect
Alan A. Altshuler	2005–2008	Urban planner
Mohsen Mostafavi	2008–2019	Architect
Sarah M. Whiting	2019–present	Architect

== Academics ==
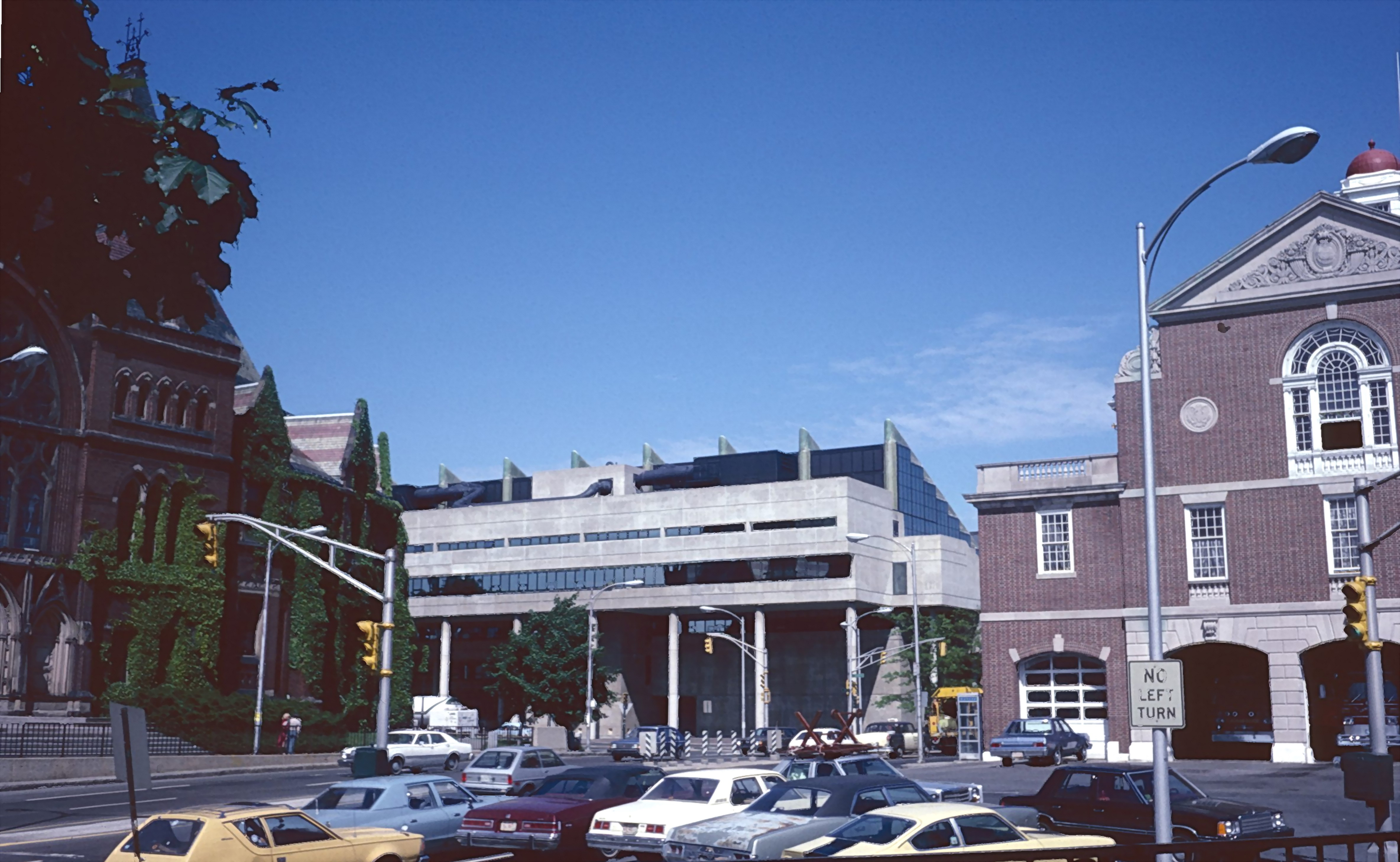
Gund Hall, Graduate School of Design, within the urban context. Architect: John Andrews, 1972

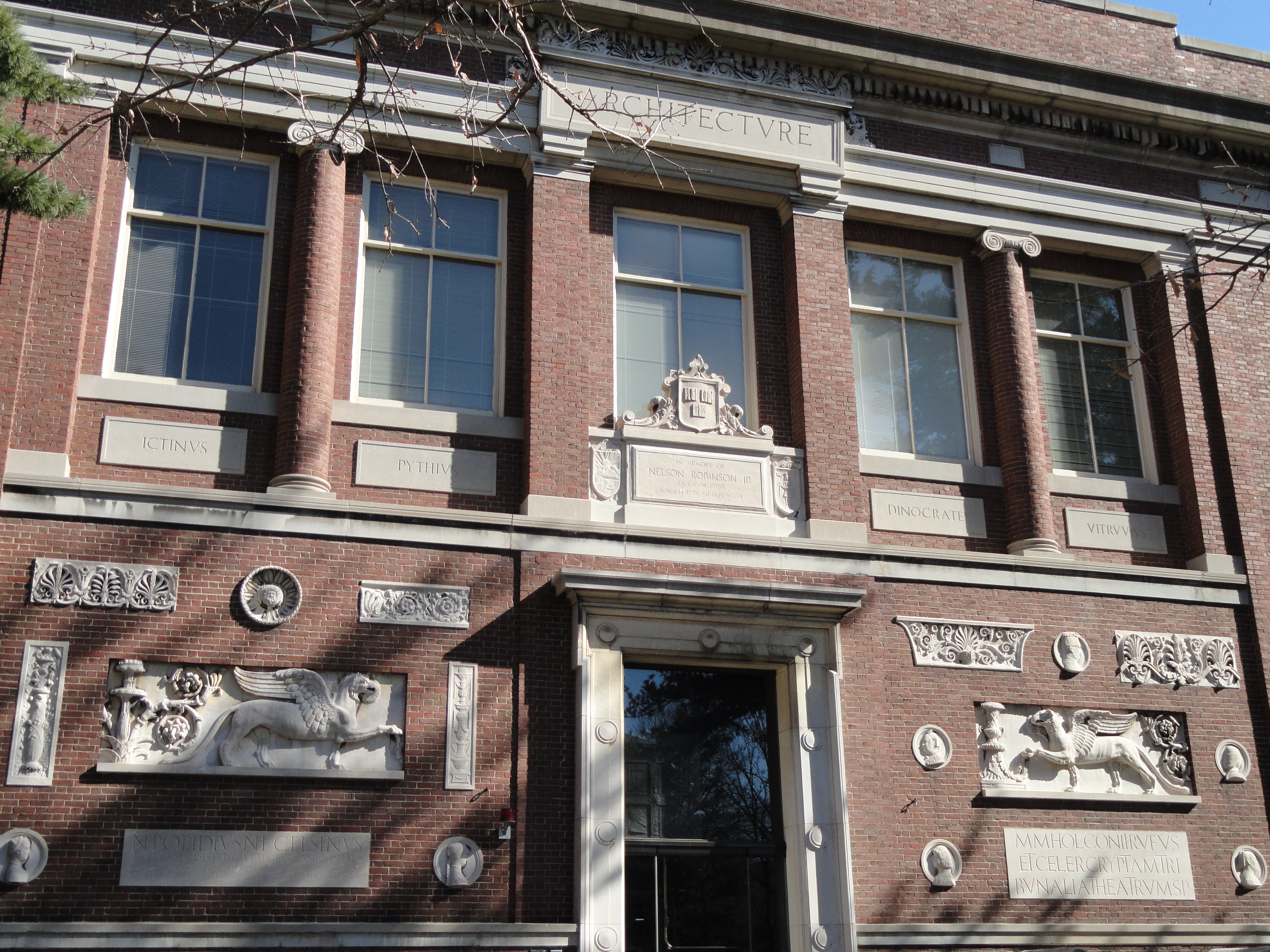
The historic Robinson Hall in Harvard Yard was the home of the GSD until 1972, when the school moved to nearby Gund Hall.

The degrees granted in the masters programs include the Master in Landscape Architecture (MLA), Master of Architecture (MArch), Master of Architecture in Urban Design (MAUD), Master of Landscape Architecture in Urban Design (MLAUD), Master in Urban Planning (MUP), Master in Real Estate (MRE), Master in Design Engineering (MDE), Master in Design Studies (MDes). The school also offers the Doctor of Design (DDes) and jointly administers a Doctor of Philosophy (PhD) degree in architecture, landscape architecture, and urban planning with the Graduate School of Arts and Sciences.

- Master in Landscape Architecture (MLA I)
- Master in Landscape Architecture (MLA I AP)
- Master in Landscape Architecture (MLA II) (Post-professional)
- Master of Landscape Architecture in Urban Design (MLAUD) (Post-professional)
- Master of Architecture (MArch I)
- Master of Architecture (MArch II) (Post-professional)
- Master of Architecture in Urban Design (MAUD) (Post-professional)
- Master in Urban Planning (MUP)
- Master in Real Estate (MRE)
- Master in Design Engineering (MDE)
- Master in Design Studies (MDes)
- Doctor of Design (DDes)
- Doctor of Philosophy in Architecture, Landscape Architecture, and Urban Planning (PhD)

=== Rankings ===
As of 2016, the program's ten-year average ranking places it first, overall, on DesignIntelligence's ranking of programs accredited by the National Architectural Accrediting Board.

=== Executive Education ===
Executive Education operates within GSD providing professional development classes. The Advanced Management Development Program in Real Estate (AMDP) is a year-long executive development course open to established real estate professionals. Upon graduating from AMDP, participants are full-fledged Harvard University Alumni. Throughout the year, Executive Education offers short duration programs in the fields of architecture, urban planning, design, and real estate to a diverse audience of learners.

== Student body ==
As of 2012–2013, there were 878 students enrolled. 362 students or 42% were enrolled in architecture, 182 students or 21% in landscape architecture, 161 students or 18% in urban planning, and 173 students or 20% in doctoral or design studies programs. Approximately, 65% of students were Americans. The average student is 27 years old. GSD students are represented by the Harvard Graduate Council (HGC), a university-wide student government organization. There are also several dozen internal GSD student clubs.

== Research and publications ==
In addition to its degree programs, the GSD administers the Loeb Fellowship, and has hosted numerous research initiatives such as the Zofnass Program for Sustainable Infrastructure and TUT-POL: Transforming Urban Transport – The Role of Political Leadership, led by Diane E. Davis and Lily Song. The school publishes the bi-annual Harvard Design Magazine, Platform, and other design books and studio works. Since 1935, the institution has presented the Wheelwright Prize, an international architecture traveling fellowship.

=== Design Research Labs ===
The GSD Design Labs synthesize theoretical and applied knowledge through research with the intent to enable design to be an agent of change in society. There are seven current labs: Material Processes and Systems Group; Energy, Environments and Design; New Geographies Lab; Responsive Environments and Artifacts Lab; Social Agency Lab; Urban Theory Lab; Geometry Lab.

== Campus ==
The GSD campus is located northeast of Harvard Yard and across the street from Memorial Hall. Gund Hall is the main building of the GSD, and it houses most of the student space and faculty offices. Other nearby buildings include space for the school's Design Research Labs, faculty offices, the Loeb Fellowship program office, and research space for students, including those in the MDes and DDes programs.

=== Gund Hall ===
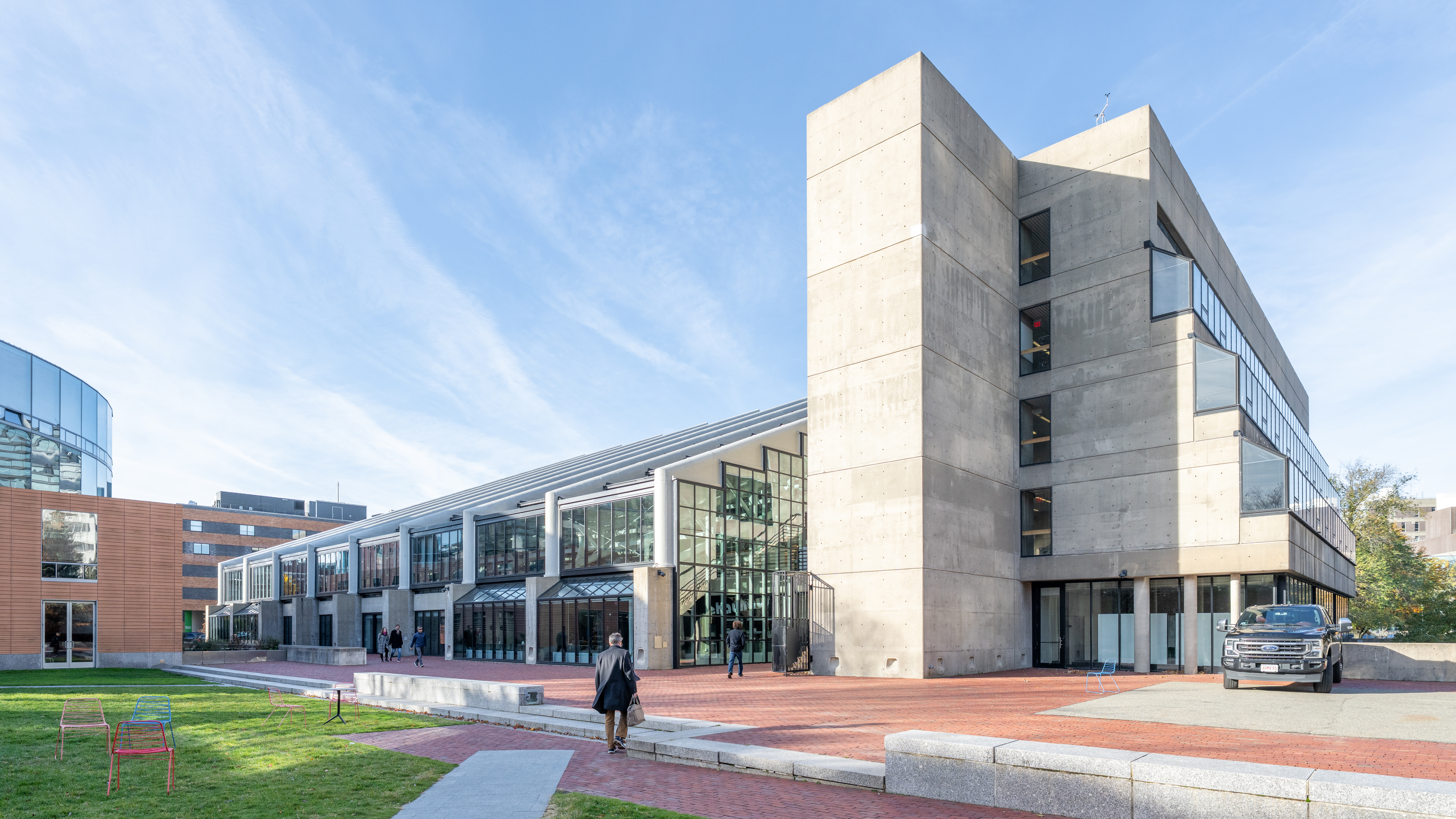
Gund Hall's huge slanted glass roof provides light to the 5 staggered levels of studio space, known as the Trays

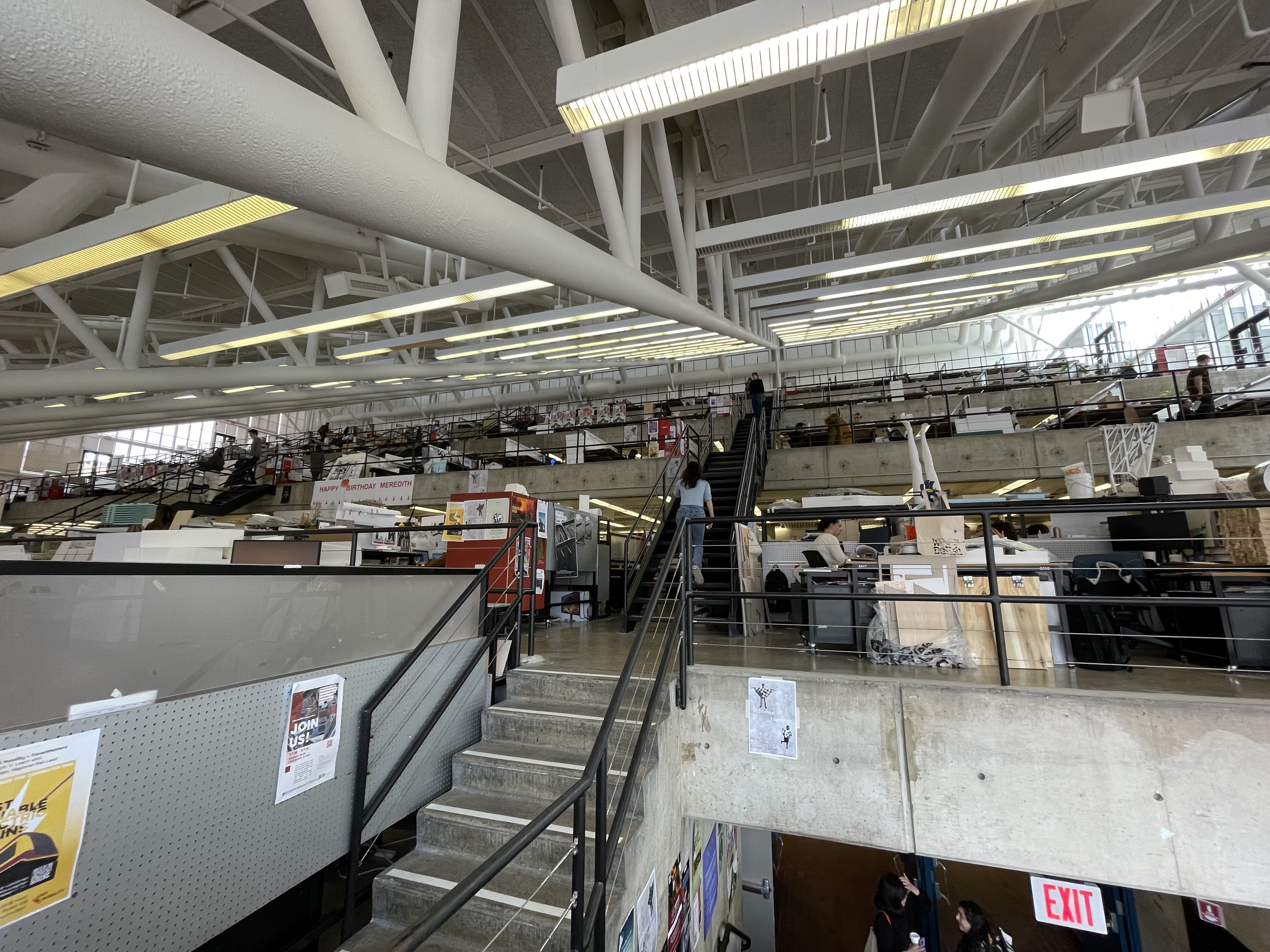
The Trays within Gund Hall.

Gund Hall is the main building, which has studio spaces and offices for approximately 800 students and more than 100 faculty and staff, lecture and seminar rooms, workshops and darkrooms, an audiovisual center, computer facilities, Chauhaus, the cafeteria, a project room, Piper Auditorium, and the Frances Loeb Library. The central studio space, also known as the Trays, extends through five levels under a stepped, clear-span roof. Gund Hall has a yard that comprises a basketball court and is often used for events, as an exhibition area for class projects, and as the setting for commencement ceremonies. The building was designed by architect John Andrews and supervised by structural engineer William LeMessurier both GSD alumni.

=== Frances Loeb Library ===
The Frances Loeb Library, is the main library of the Graduate School of Design. The library has a collection of over 300,000 books and journals. It also has a Materials and Visual Resources Department, and the Special Collections Department, which houses the GSD's rare books and manuscript collection.

=== Fabrication Lab ===
The Fabrication Lab has both traditional tools and state-of-the-art technology available for model making and prototyping to faculty research and student course work. The Fabrication Lab has a full wood shop, metals shop, printing labs, 3D printing, CNC tools, robotic machines, laser cutter machines, etc.

== Notable alumni and faculty ==
As of 2013, the GSD had over 13,000 alumni in 96 countries. The GSD had 77 faculty members and 129 visiting faculty members. 45% of the faculty members were born outside of the United States.

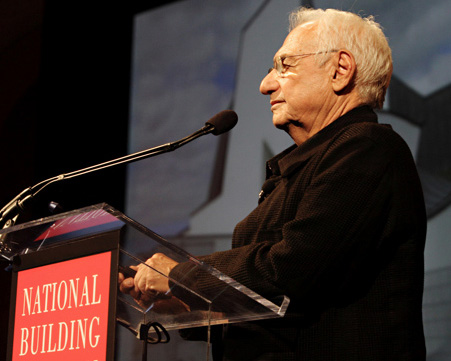
Frank Gehry studied urban planning at the GSD. Though he did not complete the program, he received an honorary doctorate from the school in 2000.

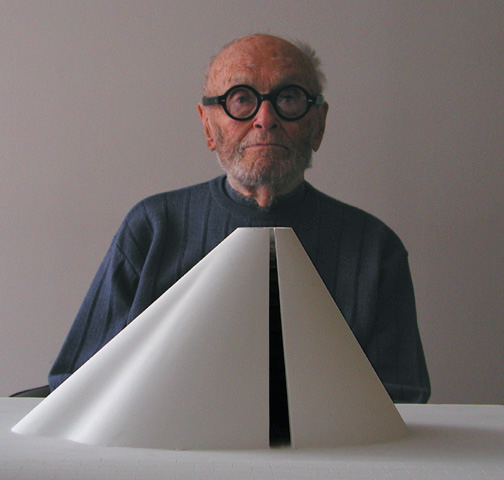
Philip Johnson, architecture alumnus

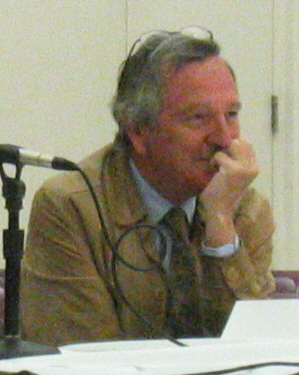
José Rafael Moneo Vallés, architecture faculty

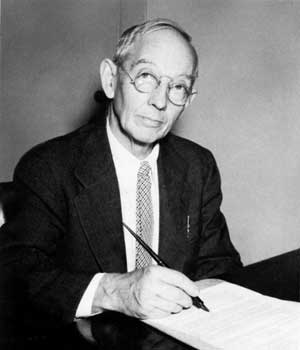
Frederick Law Olmsted Jr., founder of the landscape architecture program

=== Alumni ===
- Alan Wanzenberg, architect
- Alejandro Zaera-Polo, architect
- Alexandra Lange, critic
- Andy Fillmore, urban designer and incumbent member of the Canadian parliament for Halifax
- Anita Berrizbeitia, landscape architect and former Chair of the Department of Landscape Architecture, Harvard University
- Bruno Zevi, architect, critic, and historian
- John Andrews, designer of the GSD's Gund Hall
- Charles Jencks, landscape architect and architectural theorist
- Christopher Alexander, architect, co-author of A Pattern Language
- Christopher Charles Benninger, architect
- Lesley Chang, architect
- Lester Collins (landscape architect)
- Shaun Donovan (born 1966), former US Secretary of Housing and Urban Development and Director of the Office of Management and Budget, running for Mayor of New York City
- Cornelia Oberlander, landscape architect
- Dan Kiley, modernist landscape architect
- Danny Forster, architect and television host
- Louis Edwin Fry Sr., architect and professor; former Chair of Howard University School of Architecture
- David Gee Cheng, engineer and real estate developer, former Indonesian Deputy Minister for City Planning and Construction
- Edward Durell Stone, Modernist architect
- Edward Durell Stone Jr., landscape architect, founder of EDSA
- Edward Larrabee Barnes, prolific Modernist architect
- Eliot Noyes
- Elizabeth Whittaker, architect, founder of Merge Architects
- Farshid Moussavi
- Frank Gehry, Pritzker Prize Laureate, awarded honorary doctorate, studied urban planning
- Frida Escobedo, Architect
- Fumihiko Maki, Pritzker Prize Laureate
- Garrett Eckbo, modernist landscape architect
- George Ranalli
- Grace La, architect, founder of LA DALLMAN, and GSD Chair of Architecture
- Grant Jones, landscape architect
- Harry Seidler
- Henry N. Cobb, architect and GSD Chair of Architecture
- Hideo Sasaki, landscape architect, former department chair, founder of Sasaki Associates and Sasaki Walker Associates
- Hugh Stubbins, architect
- Ian McHarg, landscape architect and landscape planner, GIS development
- IM Pei, Pritzker Prize Laureate
- Jack Dangermond, landscape architecture, GIS development, co-founder of Environmental Systems Research Institute (ESRI)
- Jeanne Gang
- John Hejduk
- Joshua Prince-Ramus
- Julia Watson, landscape designer, author
- Julian Wood Glass Jr., businessman, philanthropist
- Julie Bargmann, landscape architect, inaugural winner of Cornelia Hahn Oberlander International Landscape Architecture Prize from The Cultural Landscape Foundation
- Ken Smith (architect)，landscape architect, educator
- Kongjian Yu, landscape architect, educator, founder of Turenscape, Peking, winner of The Cultural Landscape Foundation Cornelia Hahn Oberlander International Landscape Architecture Prize
- Lawrence Halprin, landscape architect
- Mario Torroella, architect and artist, co-founder of HMFH Architects
- Meejin Yoon, architect and Dean of Cornell University College of Architecture, Art, & Planning
- Michael Graves
- Michael Maltzan, architect
- Michaele Pride-Wells, architect and educator
- Michel Mossessian, architect, Design Principal and Founder of mossessian & partners
- Michele Michahelles, Paris-based architect, led restoration of Les Invalides
- Mikyoung Kim, landscape architect
- Mitchell Joachim, CoFounder Terreform ONE and Professor NYU
- Monica Ponce de Leon, dean and professor, Princeton University School of Architecture; principal, MPdL Studio
- Nalina Moses, architect, author, designer
- Richard T. Murphy Jr.
- Nader Tehrani (g. 1991) – Dean, The Irwin S. Chanin School of Architecture of the Cooper Union, Founding Principal of NADAAA
- Paul Rudolph
- Charles R. Wait (class 1904), architect
- Peter Walker (landscape architect)
- Philip Johnson, Pritzker Prize Laureate
- Preston Scott Cohen, architect and GSD Chair of Architecture
- Robert F. Fox Jr.
- Robert Geddes, architect and Dean of Princeton School of Architecture
- Roger Montgomery, first HUD Urban Designer, dean at U.C. Berkeley
- Shaun Donovan, former Secretary of Housing and Urban Development
- Shrinkhala Khatiwada, Miss Nepal 2018
- Thomas Dolliver Church, Landscape Architect
- Thom Mayne, Pritzker Prize laureate
- William J. R. Curtis, architectural historian
- William LeMessurier, structural engineer founder of LeMessurier Consultants
- Xu Tiantian, architect, founder of DnA Design and Architecture
- Yoshio Taniguchi
- Ayla Karacebey

=== Current faculty ===
Notable faculty currently at the school include: Anita Berrizbeitia, Eve Blau, Jennifer Bonner, Sean Canty, Preston Scott Cohen, Jeanne Gang, K. Michael Hays, Gary R. Hilderbrand, Sharon Johnston, Hanif Kara, Rem Koolhaas, Grace La, Mark Lee, Rahul Mehrotra, Rafael Moneo, Toshiko Mori, Mohsen Mostafavi, Farshid Moussavi, Benjamin Pardo, Antoine Picon and Jorge Silvetti, Peter G. Rowe, John R. Stilgoe, Sarah M. Whiting, and Krzysztof Wodiczko.

=== Emeritus faculty ===
- Alan A. Altshuler
- Martha Schwartz
- Richard T.T. Forman
- Michael Van Valkenburgh,

=== Former faculty ===
- Barbara Bestor
- Tatiana Bilbao
- Lester Collins (landscape architect)
- Pierre de Meuron
- Bjarke Ingels, Visiting Professor
- Christopher Tunnard, landscape architect
- Eduard Sekler
- George Hargreaves, landscape architect
- Jacques Herzog
- Gerhard Kallmann, Kallmann & McKinnell, designer of Boston City Hall
- Henry N. Cobb, Pei Cobb Freed & Partners, designer of John Hancock Tower in Boston
- Hugh Stubbins, architect, designer of Citigroup Center
- J. B. Jackson, vernacular American landscape writer
- Jaqueline Tyrwhitt, 1955–1969
- Richard M. Sommer, 1998–2009
- Jerzy Sołtan, 1959–1979
- John Wilson (sculptor)
- Josep Lluis Sert, dean of the GSD from 1953 to 1969 and often credited with being instrumental in bringing modernist architecture to the United States
- Joshua Prince-Ramus, Visiting Professor
- Philippe Rahm, Visiting Professor
- Kenneth John Conant
- Marcel Breuer
- Martin Wagner, German architect and housing expert
- Michael McKinnell, Kallmann & McKinnell, designer of Boston City Hall
- Monica Ponce de Leon
- Moshe Safdie, designer of Habitat
- Peter Walker, landscape architect
- Rick Joy, Visiting Professor
- Serge Chermayeff, 1953–1962
- Sigfried Giedion, author of the highly influential history Space, Time and Architecture
- Theodora Kimball Hubbard, librarian, 1911–1924
- Walter Gropius, 1937–1952; founder of Bauhaus
- Zaha Hadid, Pritzker Prize Laureate
