= The Hamptons =

Seaside group of towns, villages and hamlets

Coordinates: 40°53′5.752″N 72°30′3.82″W

- Region
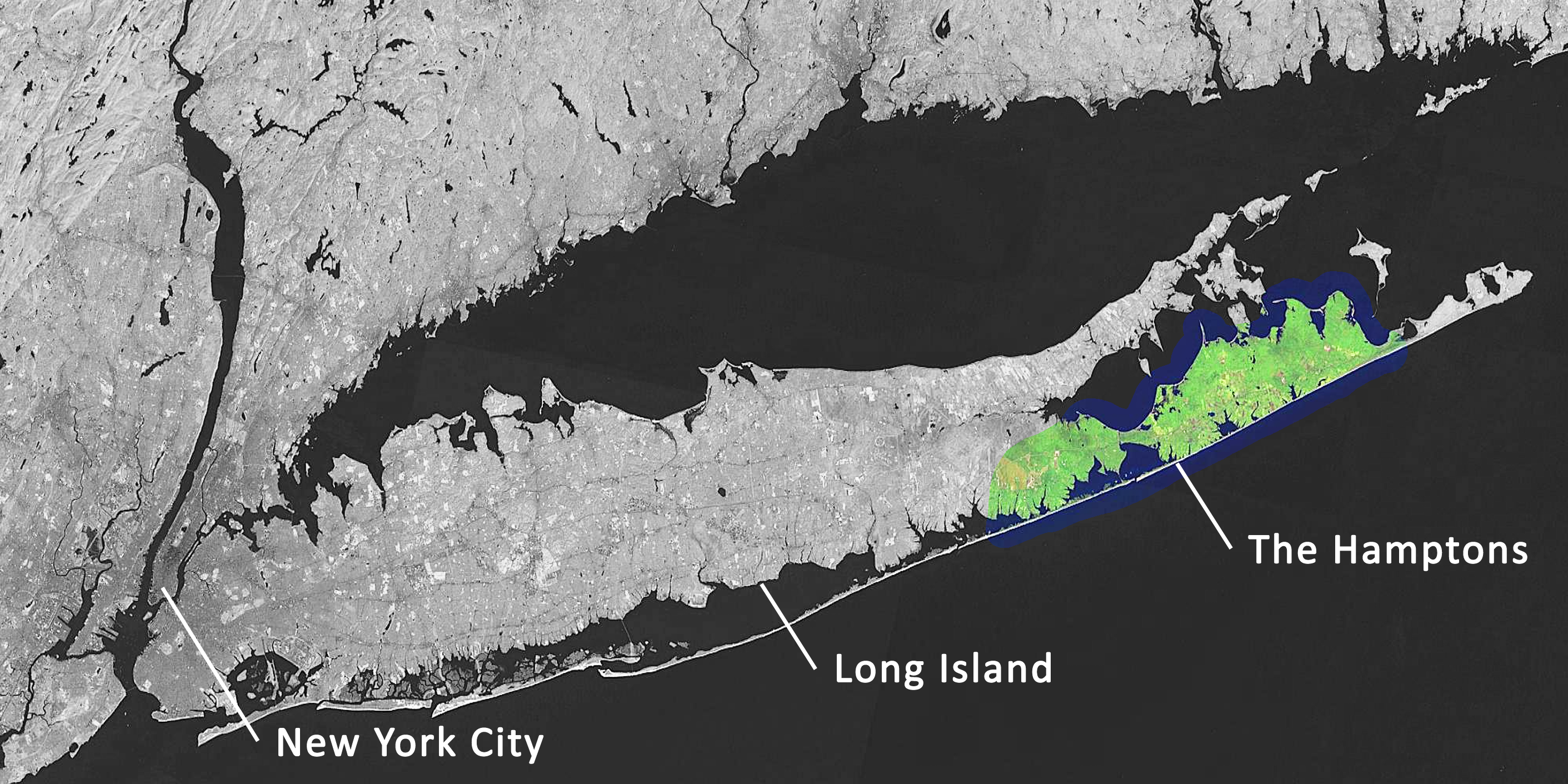
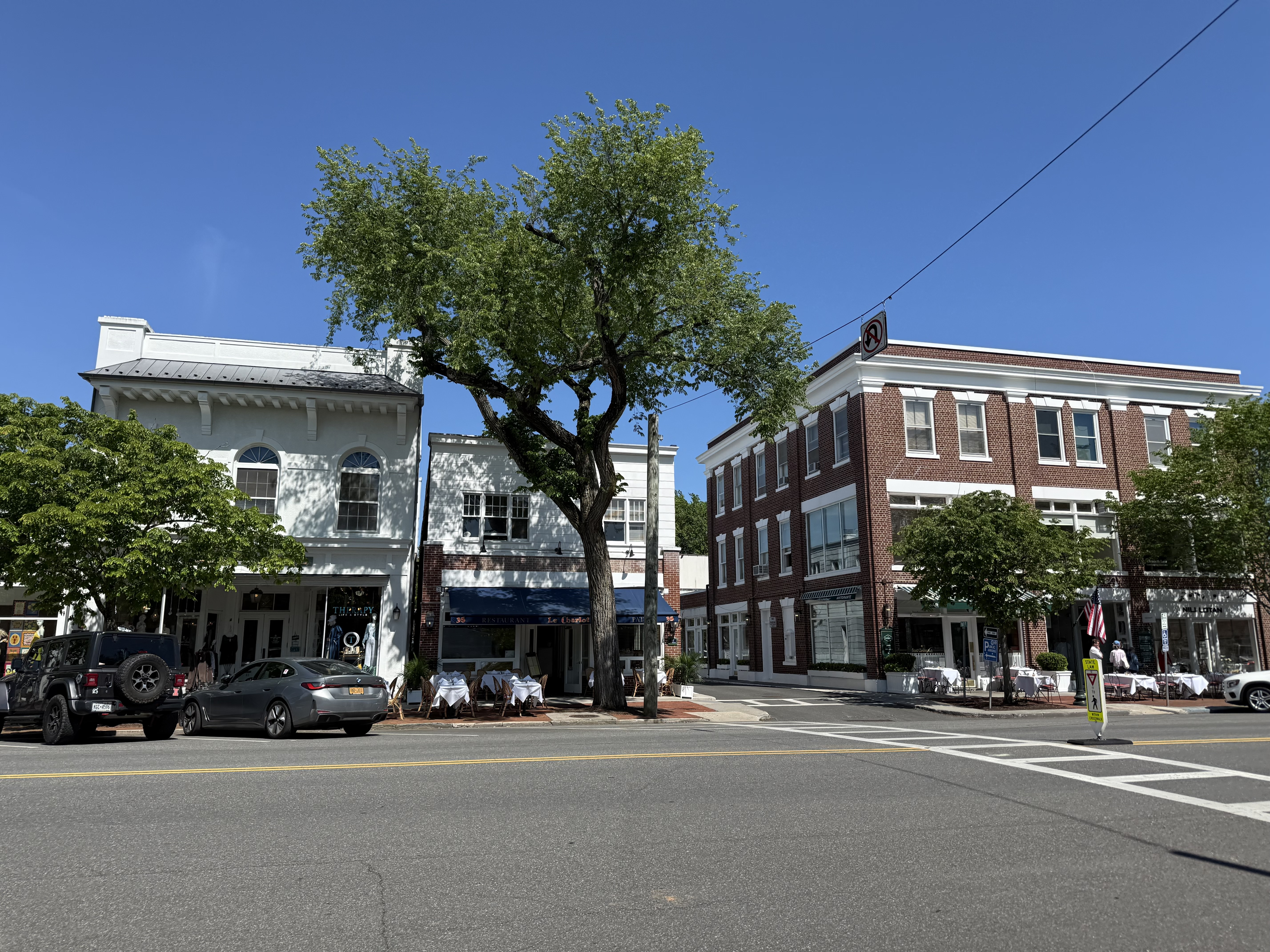
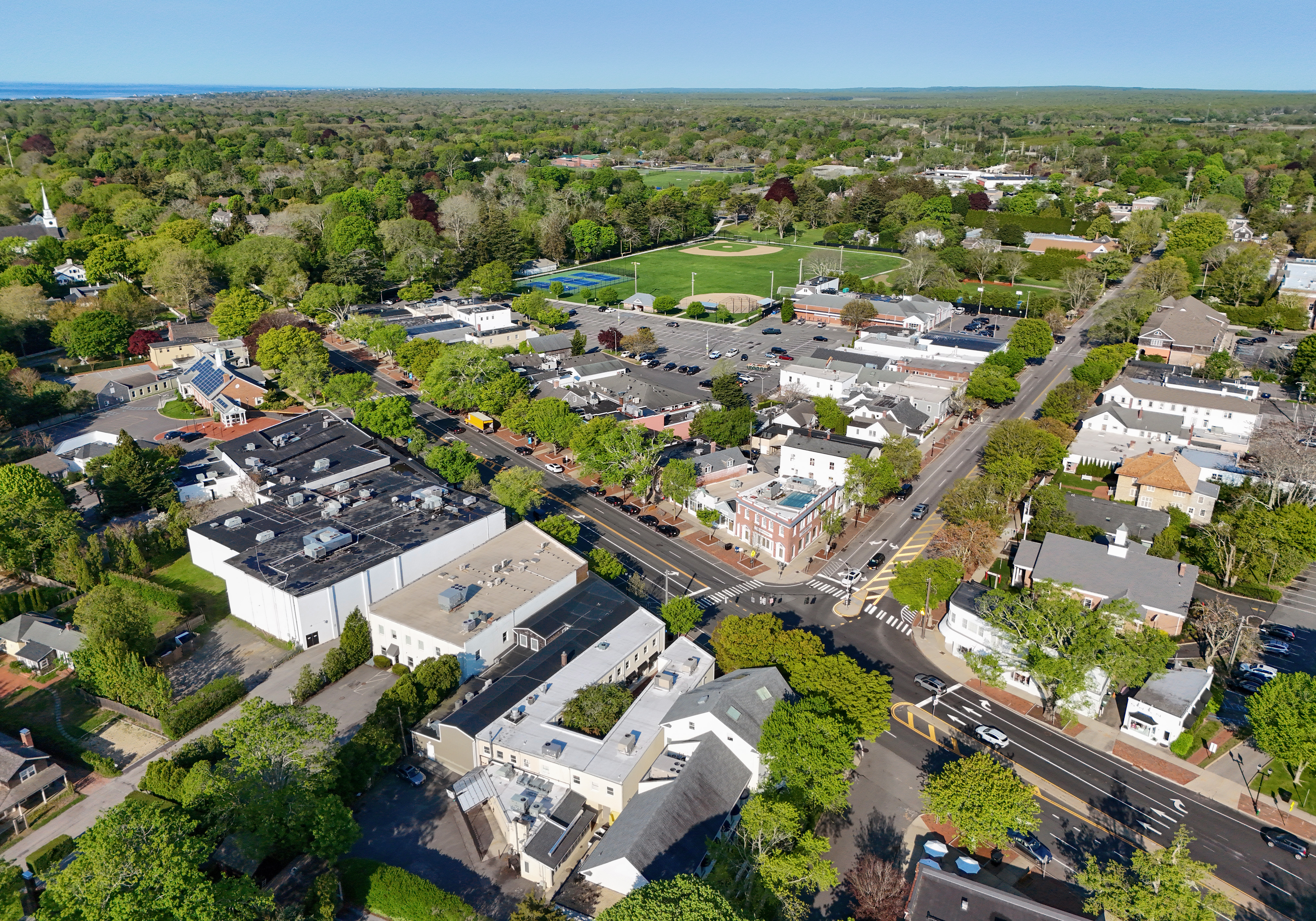
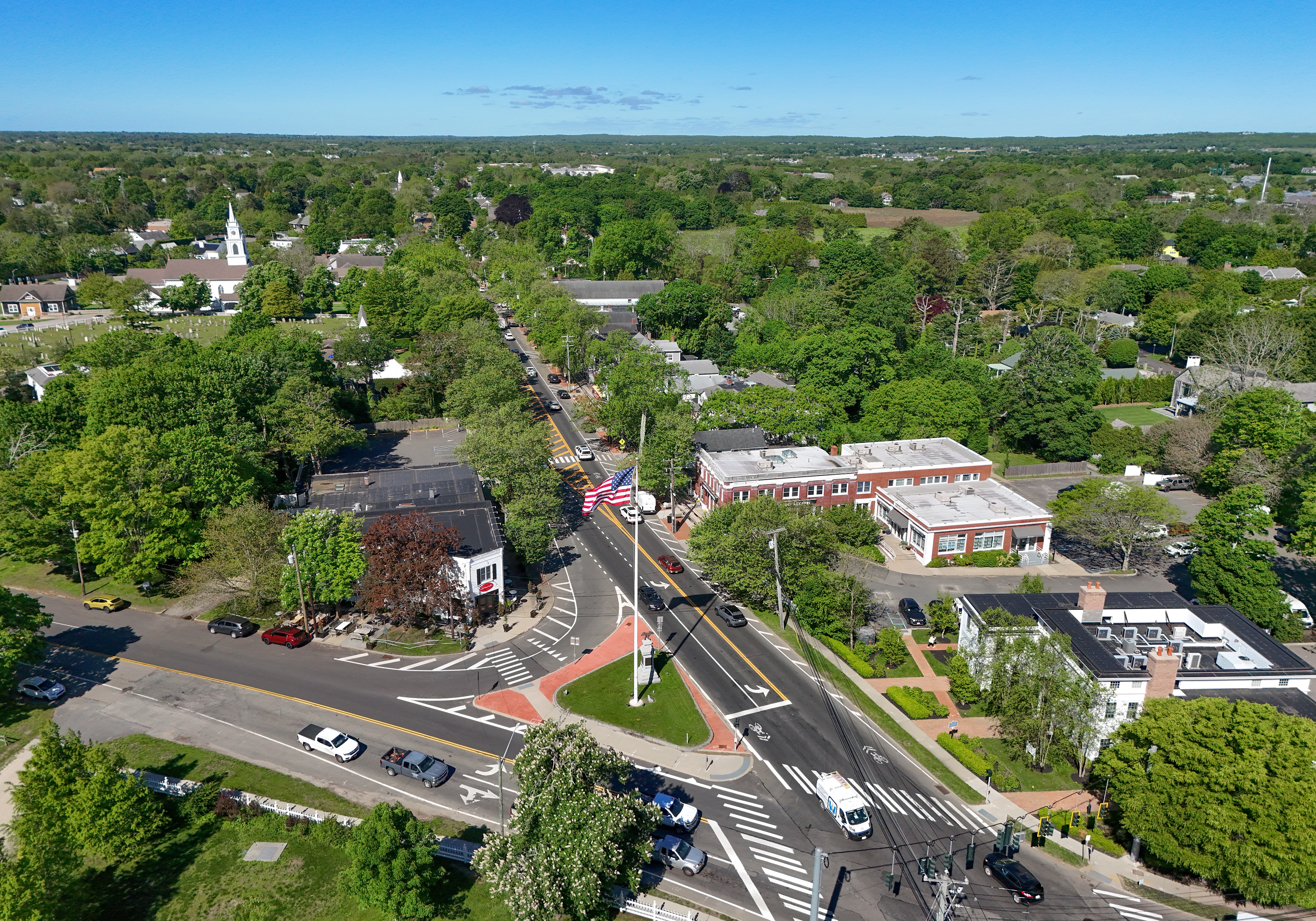
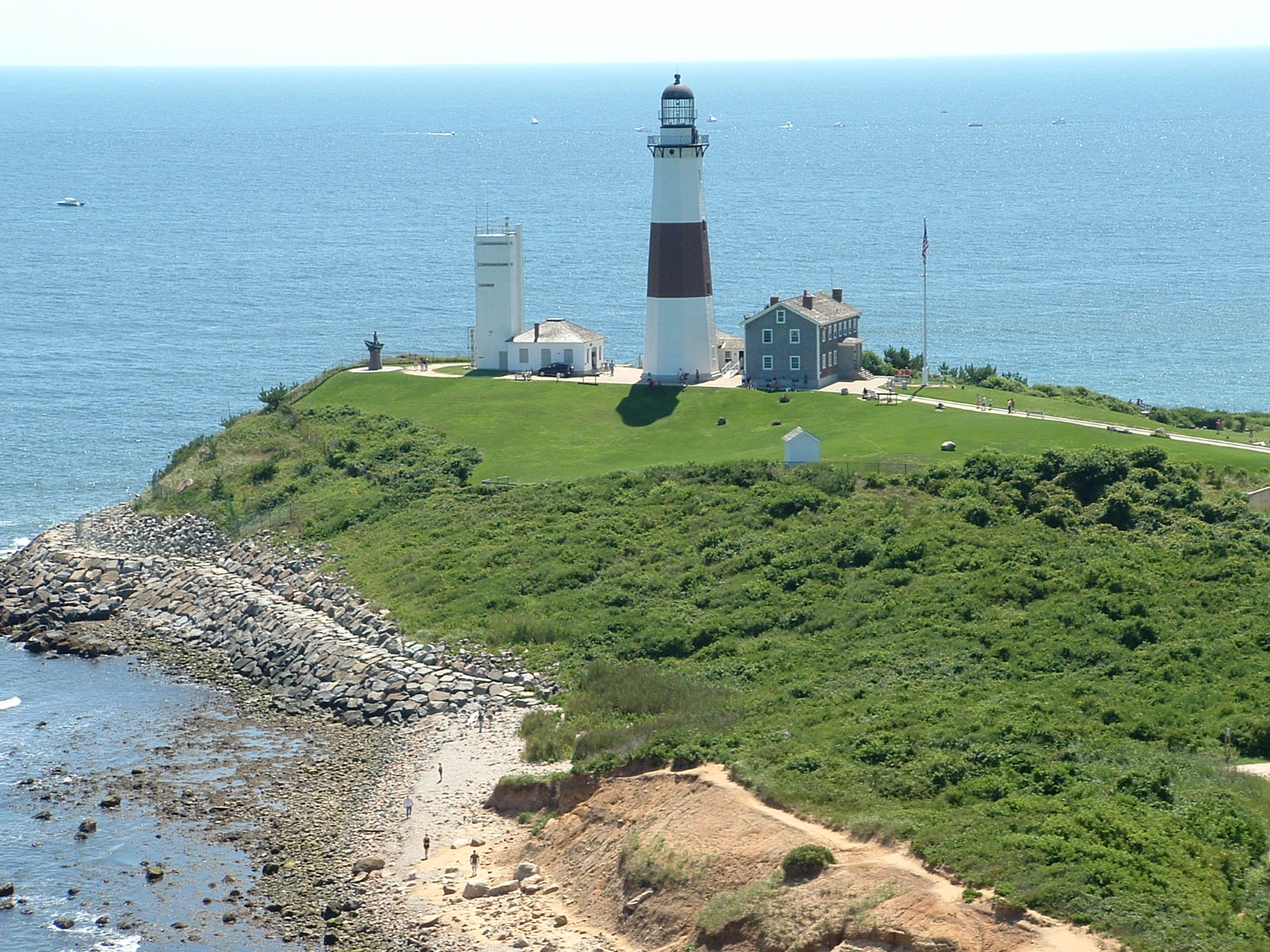
- Location on Long Island Southampton East Hampton Bridgehampton Montauk Point Lighthouse
- Country: United States
- State: New York
- County: Suffolk
- Towns: Southampton; East Hampton
- Time zone: UTC−05:00 (Eastern Time Zone)
  - Summer (DST): UTC−04:00 (EDT)
- Area codes: 631/934

The Hamptons are a group of seaside communities on the East End of Long Island in Suffolk County, New York. The region consists of the towns of Southampton and East Hampton which form the South Fork of Long Island. The area developed from early agricultural and fishing settlements and became a well-known seaside resort and summer colony by the late nineteenth century.

The Hamptons extend eastward from Westhampton to Montauk. The Atlantic Ocean forms the southern coastline, while bays such as Shinnecock Bay and Gardiners Bay lie to the north. Communities in the Town of Southampton include Westhampton Beach, Quogue, Hampton Bays, Southampton Village, Bridgehampton, Sagaponack, and part of Sag Harbor. The Town of East Hampton includes East Hampton Village, Amagansett, Springs, Wainscott, and Montauk. The Shinnecock Reservation of the Shinnecock Indian Nation is located within the Town of Southampton.

Early settlement and trade linked the Hamptons closely to coastal New England, particularly Connecticut, and these connections influenced town layouts, which in some villages resemble those of New England coastal towns. The extension of direct rail service from New York City in the late nineteenth century led to rapid growth as a seasonal destination, especially in Southampton Village, while other communities developed more gradually.

Artists have been associated with the Hamptons since the nineteenth century. Studios, schools, and seasonal artist communities formed in Southampton and Springs, and they remain part of the region’s cultural identity. The region also hosts recurring cultural events, including the Hamptons International Film Festival, held annually at venues across the South Fork.

The Hamptons are home to several prominent sporting venues. Shinnecock Hills Golf Club in Southampton has hosted the U.S. Open Championship on multiple occasions, including in 1896, 1986, 1995, 2004, 2018, and 2026. Polo and equestrian events are held seasonally, including matches organized by Bridgehampton Polo Club.

The Hamptons are also known for luxury real estate. This includes Dutch Colonial and modernist architecture, among other styles. Michael Haverland, Norman Jaffe, and Blaze Makoid have been recognized as prominent architects in the region.

Although known as a resort area, the Hamptons retain active farms and vineyards. The population increases sharply during the summer months and declines in winter, giving the region a strongly seasonal character.

== Transportation ==
The Hamptons are connected to New York City and the rest of Long Island by road, rail, and bus service. Major roadways include Montauk Highway and Sunrise Highway. Passenger rail service is provided by the Long Island Rail Road via the Montauk Branch, with limited year-round service and expanded seasonal schedules.

Private coach bus operators, including Hampton Jitney and Hampton Luxury Liner, provide frequent service between New York City and communities throughout the Hamptons. Local bus routes operated by Suffolk County serve connections within the region.
