= Harpman =

Harpman is a surname. Notable people with the surname include:

- Jacqueline Harpman (1929–2012), Belgian writer
- Louise Harpman (fl. 1987), American architect

== See also ==
- Harman (surname)
