= Yale Urban Design Workshop =

Community design center in Connecticut, US

The Yale Urban Design Workshop (YUDW) is an American community design center and clinical practice based at the Yale School of Architecture in New Haven, Connecticut . Founded in 1992, the YUDW provides a formal structure for faculty and students at Yale to engage in collaborative urban design, planning, and community development projects. The YUDW works with community-based clients in across the state to plan and design projects that respond to their needs. YUDW also coordinate's Yale's Housing Connecticut clinic, working with regional non-profit housing developers to advance affordable housing proposals.

== Leadership ==
The workshop is currently led by Andrei Harwell, who serves as the executive director and is a Senior Critic at the Yale School of Architecture. Harwell is the 2026 recipient of the Seton Ivy Award, for recognition of his community based work in New Haven. The YUDW was founded by Professor Alan Plattus when he was Associate Dean of the Yale School of Architecture. Plattus continues to serve as the Founding Director and advisor. He was inducted into the Association for Collegiate Schools of Architecture's College of Distinguished Professors in 2026 partly in recognition of his work at the YUDW and Yale. Previous faculty directors include architect Michael Haverland.

== Notable projects ==
- 2026 Greater Dwight Neighborhood Plan, New Haven, CT
- Hazel Street Houses
- Resilient Bridgeport
- Thames River Heritage Park
- Jubilee Park, Norwich, CT
- Fort Trumbull Vision, New London, CT

== Awards and recognition ==
- 2024 AIA/ACSA Housing Design Education Award
- 2024 American Planning Association Special Chapter Award
- 2021 American Planning Association Connecticut Chapter Adaptation Planning Award, Resilient Bridgeport
- 2020 AIA Connecticut Excellence Award in Urban Design And Planning, Resilient Bridgeport
- 2017 American Planning Association Connecticut Chapter Implementation Award, Thames River Heritage Park
- 2017 AIA Architecture: The Encompassing Art award, Sustaining Fishers Island

== Publications ==
- Harwell, Andrei and Alan Plattus. “On the Waterfront: Piloting and Ways to Begin,” in Small Cities Co-Lab Booklet Series, Book 3: Waterfronts. Bethlehem, PA: Lehigh University Small Cities Lab, 2026.
- Saket Malhotra, Alixandra P Rachman, Carmen Muniz-Almaguer, Annie Harper, Andrei Simon Harwell and Robert Dubrow. “Beating the heat in a low-income urban community of color: a qualitative study of coping strategies, barriers, and solutions.” Environmental Research: Health, 1 October 2025. (link to article)
- Harwell, Andrei and Alan Plattus. “Performative and Representational Infrastructure: Its Role in Community Engagement and Empowerment for Resilience,” chapter in Resilient Urbanism. Oxfordshire: Routledge, 2025. (link to chapter)

== Bibliography ==
- Biao, Abiba. “Dwight Looks To The Present, Plans For The Future.” New Haven Independent. 29 Apr. 2029 (link to article)
- “Awards celebrate those strengthening the bond between Yale and New Haven.” YaleNews. 9 Apr. 2026 (link to article)
- Mahadevan, Mona. “Hazel Street Welcomes New Homeowners.” New Haven Independent. 15 Dec. 2026. (link to article)
- “Andrei Harwell selected as Krane Art History Scholar-in-residence.” Connecticut College News. 9 Sept. 2025. (link to article)
- Chen, Alina Rose. “Hazel St. Homes Near Completion; Yale Profs Slam Guv For Housing Veto.” New Haven Independent. 18 Jul. 2025. (link to article)
- Walker, Adam. “Interdisciplinary graduate course set to yield four two-family homes in Newhallville.” Yale Daily News. 3 Apr. 2024. (link to article)
- Hays, Elizabeth. “Eyeing Asthma, Dwight Tracks Pollution.” New Haven Independent. 16 Apr. 2021. (link to article)
- Cummings, Mike. “Storm front: Yale center helps Bridgeport plan for climate threats.” Yale News. 16 Dec. 2020. (link to article)
- Connolly, Bess. “Reimagining urban environments post-pandemic.” Yale News. 21 Jul. 2020. (link to article)
- “Yale-professor om Göteborgs prestigebyggen: Allt här signalerar halvfär diga projekt.” Dagens Nyheter. 25 Oct. 2019.
- O’Connell, Kim. “Beyond the Classroom, Beyond Borders.” Architect. Vol. 105, Issue 7, Jul. 2016, 63–64. (link to article)
- McDonald, Amy Athey. “Yale’s Urban Design Workshop building bridges to the first peace park in the Middle East.” Yale News. 9 Jun. 2014. (link to article)
- Edgecomb, Kathleen. “Plan envisions mixed-use neighborhood at Fort Trumbull.” The Day. Vol. 131, No. 94, 3 Oct. 2011, A1.
- Gosselin, Kenneth R. “Waterfront Makeover in the Works.” Hartford Courant. Vol. CLXXV No. 271, 28 Sept. 2011, A10.
- Friends of the Earth Middle East. A Promise of Peace: The Jordan River Peace Park. Jerusalem: Friends of the Earth Middle East, 2011.
- Whitman, Ried, director and Sofy Solomon, creator. Bridging Waters: Creating a Peace Park on the River Jordan. 2010. 33 min. (link to film)
- Naimi, Shala. “Building Peace on the Israeli-Jordanian Border.” New Haven Advocate. 6 Oct. 2009.
- “A peace park for the Middle East.” Yale Alumni Magazine. Sept./Oct. 2008. (link to article)
- “Yale peace park idea floated.” JTA News. 29 Apr. 2008.
- Yale Urban Design Workshop.” An Architektur. No. 19, Sept. 2008.
