= Blaze Makoid =

Blaze Makoid is an American architect. Makoid is the founding partner at BMA Architects, which focuses on private luxury residential projects. He is known for his custom modernist homes in the Hamptons and other luxury enclaves in the United States.

== Early life and education ==
Makoid grew up in Philadelphia, Pennsylvania and graduated from the Rhode Island School of Design in 1985. After graduating, he worked for New York architect and developer Cary Tamarkin and then became design director of the Hillier Group's Philadelphia office.

== Career ==
In 2001, Makoid founded Blake Makoid Architecture in Bridgehampton, New York. Starting in the Hamptons, the firm changed its name to BMA Architects and added offices in Miami, Florida and Lake Tahoe. Makoid's projects include Daniel's Lane in Sagaponack, Ferry Road House in North Haven, and Martis Camp 506 near Lake Tahoe.

In 2024, Makoid designed Vera Wang’s Manhattan headquarters. In 2025, BMA Architects was chosen as the architect for Citadel founder Ken Griffin’s proposed private mega-yacht marina on Miami Beach’s Terminal Island.

== Personal life ==
Makoid built his own house in Sag Harbor, New York. He has a daughter named Alexandra.

== Awards ==
Makoid has won several American Institute of Architects awards. In 2025, Forbes named BMA Architects one of “America’s Best In-State Residential Architects.”
