= Louise Harpman =

American architect

Louise Harpman is an American architect, urban designer, academic, and author. She is a professor of architecture, Urban Design, and Sustainability at New York University’s Gallatin School of Individualized Study and the founding principal of the design and research practice, Louise Harpman__PROJECTS. She was previously a founder and principal of the architecture and design firm, Specht Harpman (now known as Specht Architects).

== Education ==
Harpman earned her undergraduate A.B. degree from Harvard University in 1987, where she graduated with honors in East Asian studies. During her undergraduate years, she lived in Japan for 18 months with the support of a Reischauer Institute Fellowship. She completed an M.Phil. degree in Social anthropology at the University of Cambridge in 1988. In 1993, she received her professional M.Arch. degree from the Yale School of Architecture. At Yale, she won the American Institute of Architects' Henry Adams Certificate and Janet Cain Sielaff Prize.

== Architectural practice ==
Harpman was a founder and principal for over twenty years (1995–2016) of the design firm Specht Harpman. Harpman's practice won many awards and garnered much recognition from notable architecture and design organizations. In 2002, Harpman and her partner, Scott Specht, were named “Emerging Voices" by the Architectural League of New York. Harpman was listed in House and Garden magazine's roster of 2007 international "Tastemakers." In 2008, Harpman and her firm were recognized in Wallpaper* magazine's annual Architects’ Directory as one of the world's "top 50 up-and-coming architectural practices." The firm won American Institute of Architects design awards for the zeroHouse; Manhattan Micro Loft in New York, NY; Doyle Hall at St. Edward's University in Austin, Texas; Oasis Advertising in New York, NY; Concrete Media in New York, NY; Modern Barn in Wilton, CT; the New Canaan Residence in New Canaan, Connecticut and Casa Xixim in Tulum, Mexico.

== Teaching and scholarship ==
Harpman is a professor of architecture, Urban Design, and Sustainability at NYU’s Gallatin School of Individualized Study (2010–present). She is an associated faculty member at NYU's Robert F. Wagner Graduate School of Public Service and an affiliated faculty member at the Furman Center for Real Estate and Urban Policy. Harpman is a Faculty Advisor to NYU's Marron Institute of Urban Management. Additionally, she is a founder and director of Global Design NYU, a research and design consortium. She taught previously at the University of Texas at Austin School of Architecture, the Yale School of Architecture, and the University of Pennsylvania School of Design, Graduate School of Architecture and Planning. At Yale, she was Studio Coordinator for the Yale Building Project (1996–2003) and Coordinator of Undergraduate Senior Projects. At the University of Texas at Austin, she was Associate Dean for Undergraduate Programs (2003–08) and a Fellow of the Harwell Hamilton Harris Professorship. While at UT Austin, Harpman also initiated the DesignBuildTexas program and served as a Studio Director for the Alley Flat Initiative, a program created by the UT Austin School of Architecture to "create an adaptive and self-perpetuating delivery system for sustainable and affordable housing in Austin."

== Publications (selected) ==
Harpman is the co-author of the book Coffee Lids: Peel, Pinch, Pucker, Puncture (Princeton Architectural Press, 2018) which features essays about design, design thinking, and innovation, as well as photographs and original patent drawings for over 200 unique coffee lids. She is the co-owner of the world's largest collection of independently patented coffee lids. She is co-author of Global Design: Elsewhere Envisioned (Prestel, 2014) and co-editor of Perspecta 30: Settlement Patterns (MIT Press, 1999). Harpman is the author of the Brooklyn Public Library Design Guidelines (City of New York, Design Trust for Public Space, Inc., 1996.)
