= Haverford College =

Private college in Haverford, Pennsylvania, US

- Former name: The Haverford School (1833–1856)
- Motto: Non doctior, sed meliore doctrina imbutus
- Motto in English: "Not more learned, but steeped in a higher learning"
- College newspaper: The Clerk; The Bi-College News
- Type: Private liberal arts college
- Established: 1833; 193 years ago
- Religious affiliation: None (formerly Orthodox Quakers)
- Academic affiliations: COFHE; Quaker Consortium; Tri-College Consortium
- Endowment: $755.25 million (2025)
- President: Wendy Raymond
- Faculty: 165
- Undergraduates: 1,435
- Location: Haverford community Haverford Township; Lower Merion Township, Pennsylvania, United States; 40°00′35″N 75°18′26″W
- Campus: 216 acres (0.87 km^{2}); Suburban
- Acceptance rate: 12.4%
- Colors: Red, black, and grey
- Nickname: Fords
- Sporting affiliations: NCAA Division III – CC
- Mascot: Black Squirrel
- Website: haverford.edu

Haverford College (/ˈhævərfərd/ HAV-ər-fərd) is a private liberal arts college in Haverford, Pennsylvania, United States. It was founded as a men's college in 1833 by members of the Religious Society of Friends (Quakers). Haverford began accepting non-Quakers in 1849 and women in 1980.

The college offers Bachelor of Arts and Bachelor of Science degrees in 31 majors across humanities, social sciences, and natural sciences disciplines. It is a member of the Tri-College Consortium, which includes Bryn Mawr and Swarthmore colleges, as well as the Quaker Consortium, which includes those schools as well as the University of Pennsylvania.

All of the college's approximately 1,400 students are undergraduates, and nearly all reside on campus. Social and academic life is governed by an honor code and influenced by Quaker philosophy. Its 216-acre (87 ha) suburban campus has predominantly stone Quaker Colonial Revival architecture. The college's athletics teams compete as the Fords in the Centennial Conference of NCAA Division III.

== History ==
Haverford College was founded in 1833 by members of the Orthodox Philadelphia Yearly Meeting of the Religious Society of Friends to ensure an education grounded in Quaker values for young Quaker men. It was the earliest Quaker liberal arts college. The college's seal bore the likeness of William Penn, which remains on the seal today. In 1849 it opened enrollment to non-Quakers. Originally an all-male institution, Haverford began admitting female transfer students in 1969 and became fully co-educational in 1980. The first woman to graduate (the wife of a faculty member) was a member of the class of 1971. The first Black student to graduate from Haverford, Osmond Pitter, a Jamaican Quaker, did so in 1926. He became a doctor and returned to practice medicine in Jamaica. The second (and first African-American to receive a bachelor's degree) was Paul B. Moses, class of 1951, who became an art history professor at the University of Chicago. During the intervening quarter century, a number of other Black men, including Howard Thurman, enrolled as graduate students.

For most of the 20th century, Haverford's total enrollment was kept below 300, but the college went through two periods of expansion during and after the 1970s, reaching a total of about 1350 students in 2020. Thomas R. Tritton was president of the college between 1997 and 2007 and oversaw the construction of several new buildings, including the Marian E. Koshland Integrated Natural Sciences Center and the Douglas B. Gardner Integrated Athletic Center.

In the fall of 2020, much of the student body went on strike, sparked by anger at the administration's response to the killing of Walter Wallace in Philadelphia. The strike later expanded into a broader protest over concerns of racial injustice at the college. Some students opposed the strike, arguing that strikers were demonizing students who expressed concerns and suppressing dissenting views. After two weeks, the strike ended when the administration agreed to most of the organizers' demands.

Wendy Raymond has been president of the college since 2019. On May 7, 2025, testifying at a hearing of the United States House Committee on Education and Workforce, Raymond was questioned regarding her handling of antisemitism on campus. Representative Elise Stefanik noted that "while the other presidents’ statements outlined specific steps taken to prevent antisemitism and specific disciplinary measures in particular, Haverford has not", and president Raymond was criticized in part because she repeatedly refused to answer questions about aggregate statistics or specific instances of students and faculty who were suspended or otherwise disciplined by the college for antisemitic conduct. As a result, Representative Ryan Mackenzie of Pennsylvania threatened to withdraw federal funding from the college. To Jewish Haverford students, Raymond stated, “I wish to make it unmistakably clear that you are valued members in our community … I am sorry that I have let you down.” In November 2025, Raymond announced her retirement effective in June 2027. On October 19, 2026, the college announced that Brian T. Edwards, dean of Tulane University's School of Liberal Arts, had been named its president-elect; he is scheduled to succeed Raymond and take office on July 1, 2027.

== Honor code ==
In 1897, the students and faculty of Haverford voted to adopt an honor code to govern academic affairs. Since 1963, every student has been allowed to schedule his or her own final exams. Take-home examinations are also standard at Haverford and may include strict instructions such as time limits, prohibitions on using assigned texts or personal notes, and calculator usage. All students are bound to follow these instructions by the code.

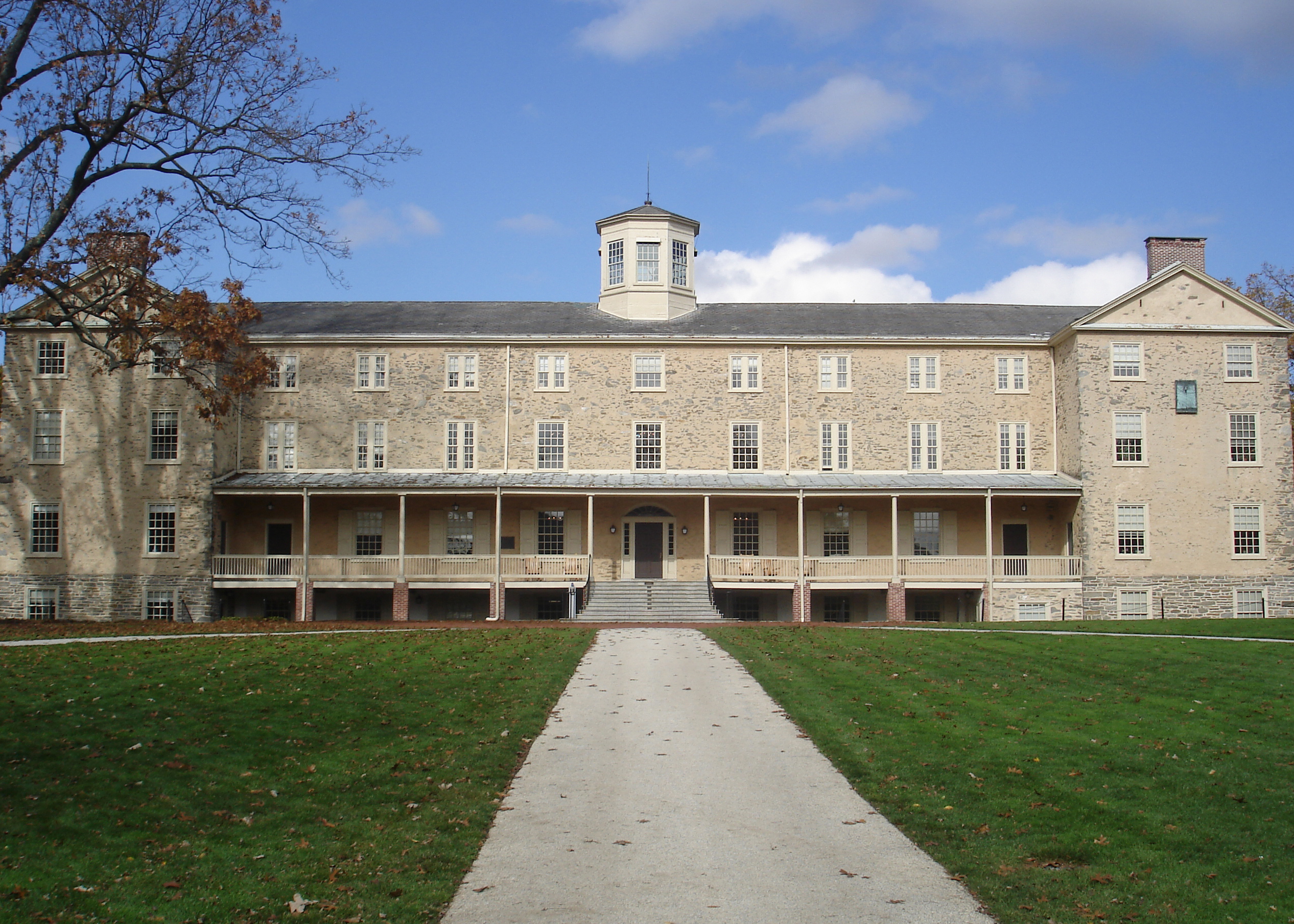
Founders Hall, completed in 1833

Originally conceived as a code of academic honesty, the honor code had expanded by the 1970s to govern social interactions. The code does not list specific rules of behavior, but rather emphasizes a philosophy of mutual trust, concern and respect, as well as genuine engagement, that students are expected to follow. A student (or other community member) who feels that another has broken the code, is encouraged not to look the other way but rather to confront and engage in a dialogue with the potential offender, before taking matters to an honor council which can help mediate the dispute.

Every student is required to sign a pledge agreeing to the honor code prior to matriculation. The honor code is entirely student-run. It originated with a body of students who felt it necessary and it is amended and ratified by current students annually at an event called "Plenary". Student government officers administer the code and all academic matters are heard by student juries. More severe matters are addressed by administrators. Abstracts from cases heard by students and joint administrator-student panels are distributed to all students by several means, including as print-outs in mailboxes. The trial abstracts are made anonymous by the use of pseudonyms who are often characters from entertainment or history.

The honor code failed to be ratified in 2013, 2018, and 2023 although on all occasions it was reinstated following special assemblies of the student body.

== Academics ==
Haverford offers Bachelor of Arts and Bachelor of Science degrees in 31 majors across humanities, social sciences and natural sciences. All departments require a senior thesis, project or research for graduation, and many departments also have junior-level seminar or year-long project such as in biology (superlab) and chemistry (superlab). The college also maintains a distribution requirement, spreading course work in all three areas of humanities, social sciences and natural sciences, in addition to major course works. Its most popular majors, by 2021 graduates, were:

Chemistry (34)
Computer science (31)
Economics (31)
Political science & government (29)
Biology/biological sciences (27)
Psychology (25)
English language & literature (21)
Mathematics (20)

=== Consortium ===
Haverford's consortium relationship with Bryn Mawr, Swarthmore, and the University of Pennsylvania (the Quaker Consortium) greatly expands its course offerings. Haverford and Bryn Mawr have a particularly close relationship (the Bi-College Consortium), with over 2,000 students cross-registering between the two schools. The campuses are only 1 mile apart and a shuttle called the Blue Bus runs frequently back and forth. Some departments, such as Religion and Music, are housed at Haverford, while others like Theatre and Growth and Structure of Cities are at Bryn Mawr. Students can major in these departments from both colleges. Furthermore, students of one of the Tri-Collegiate Consortium Schools (Swarthmore, Bryn Mawr, and Haverford) are allowed to pursue a major in a subject at a Tri-Collegiate institution apart from the one they are a student of.

=== Admissions ===
Admissions statistics
- 2025 entering class
- Admit rate: 13.3%
- Yield rate: 44.3%

Test scores middle 50%^{[i]}
- SAT Total: 1460–1530
- SAT EBRW: 720–760
- SAT Math: 720–780
- ACT Composite: 33–35

High school GPA^{[ii]}
- Top 10%: 93.0%
- Top 25%: 100%

U.S. News deemed Haverford's admissions "most selective," with the class of 2026 acceptance rate being 14.2%. Applying for admission to the class of 2026 were 5,658 applicants; 804 were admitted. Of those admitted submitting such data, 96% were in the top 10% of their high school class and 100% were in the top 20% of their high school. Of those admitted to the class of 2026, 54.5% identified themselves as persons of color, and 14% of those admitted were first generation college students. The college is need-aware for domestic applicants, having ended its need-blind policy in 2016.

=== Rankings ===
Academic rankings

Liberal arts
- U.S. News & World Report: 24
- Washington Monthly: 6

National
- Forbes: 72
- WSJ/College Pulse: 36

Haverford is ranked 8th among liberal arts colleges in the 2022 Wall Street Journal/Times Higher Education College Rankings, tied for 24th out of 207 U.S. liberal arts colleges in the 2025 "Best Colleges" ranking by U.S News & World Report, and ranked 16th for "Best Value" and tied at 14th for "Best Undergraduate Teaching" out of the 207 liberal arts colleges. Washington Monthly ranked Haverford 6th in 2024 among 194 liberal arts colleges in the U.S. based on its contribution to the public good, as measured by social mobility, research, and promoting public service. The college was ranked 72nd across 500 universities and colleges in the 2024–25 edition of Forbes' "Top Colleges", and 18th among liberal arts colleges alone. Niche ranked the school the 7th best national liberal arts college for 2021.

=== Graduates ===
According to the National Science Foundation, Haverford ranked ninth among all colleges and universities in the United States, in the proportion of its graduates who went on to earn PhDs across all fields from 2013 to 2022. When limited to doctorates in science and engineering disciplines, Haverford ranked eighth.

== Campus ==
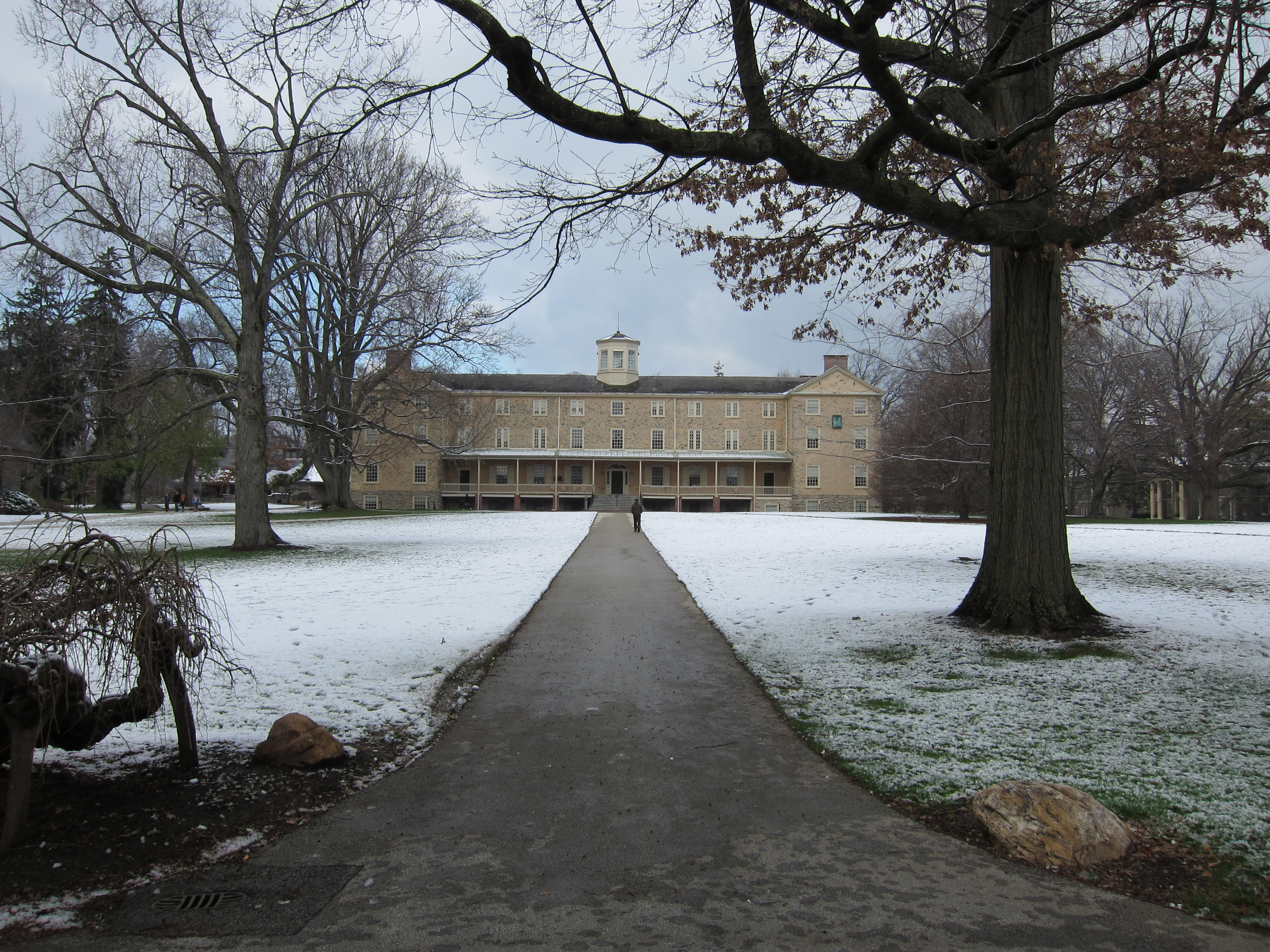
Founders Hall after snowfall

Haverford College is located on the Main Line northwest of Philadelphia. The school is connected to Center City Philadelphia by the Paoli/Thorndale Line commuter rail system and the M (formerly known as the Norristown High Speed Line). The campus itself is situated in an affluent suburban neighborhood, adjacent to the Haverford School, the Merion Golf Club and the historically African-American South Ardmore neighborhood. The Merion Cricket Club, one of the oldest country clubs in the United States, is situated blocks away. Nearby attractions within walking distance include various food markets, grocery stores, restaurants, and Suburban Square, which hosts retail stores, restaurants and a local farmer's market.

The larger southern portion of campus is in Haverford Township, with a smaller northern portion in Lower Merion Township.

=== Buildings ===
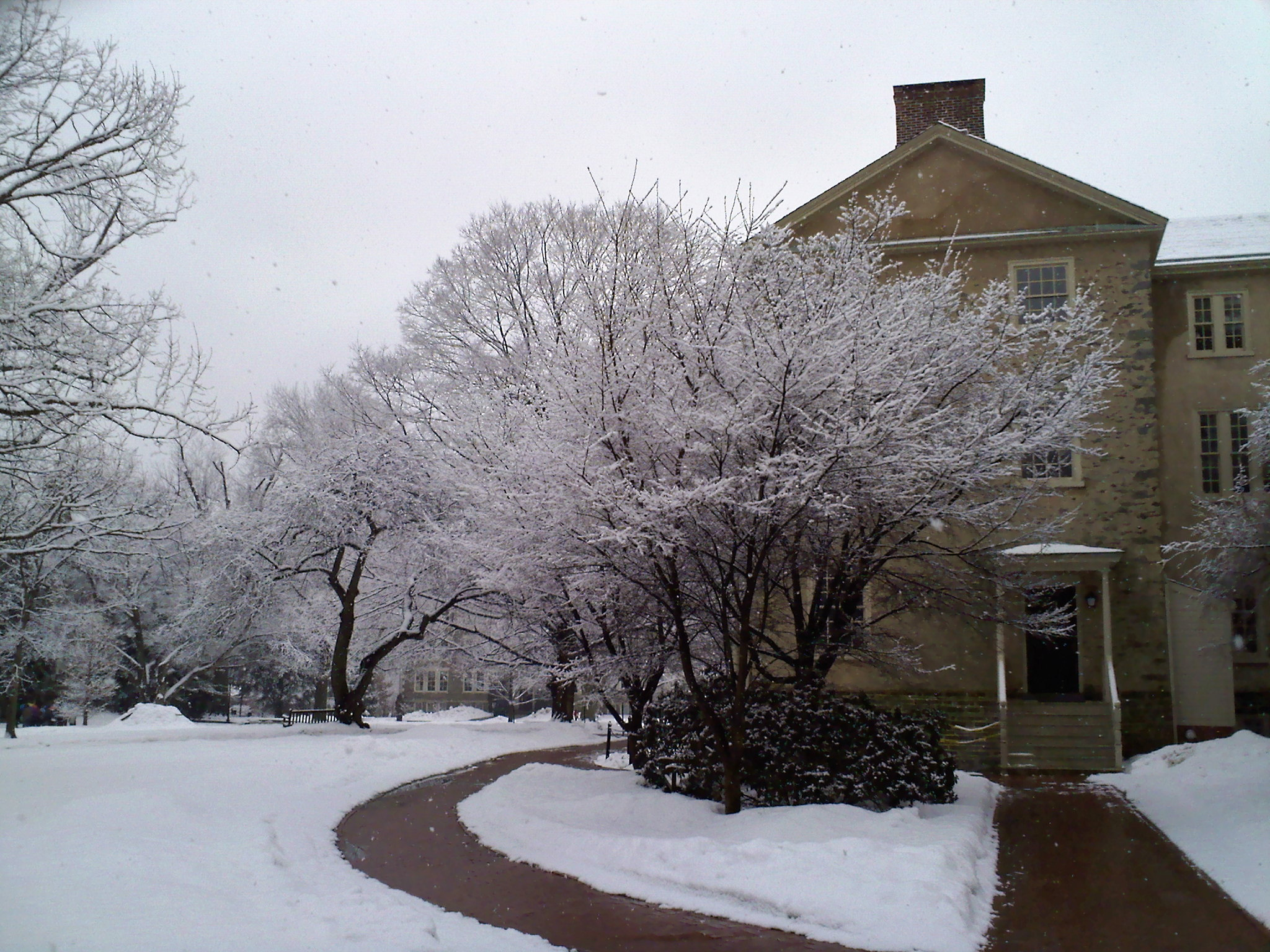
Cherry trees and Founders Hall

The college has more than 50 academic, athletic, and residential buildings, which are mostly stone and reflect Quaker and colonial design principles. The most recent additions are the Marian E. Koshland Integrated Natural Science Center and the Douglas B. Gardner '83 Integrated Athletic Center (colloquially referred to as the GIAC). Two dorms, by Tod Williams Billie Tsien Architects, began housing freshman and upperclassman in the fall of 2012.

Haverford's Lutnick Library (formerly known as Magill Library) contains more than a half million of its own volumes and has access to nearly two million more through its unusual Tripod computerized catalog system, which integrates its library with those of neighboring Bryn Mawr and Swarthmore Colleges. In addition to Lutnick's main resources, the college maintains three smaller music, science, and astronomy libraries and a number of special collections including the Quaker and Special Collections sections that include numerous rare books and other treasures such as the C.C. Morris (Class of 1904) Cricket Library.

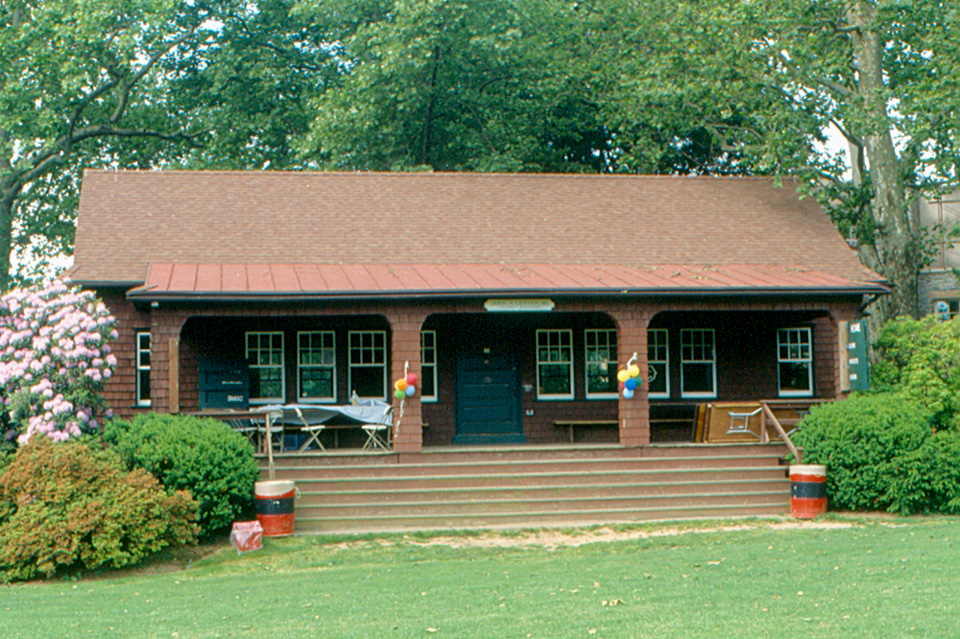
John Ashby Lester Cricket Pavilion next to Cope's Field Cricket Pitch

In the fall of 2017, the college unveiled renovations to Ryan Gym, which now serves as a new Visual Culture, Arts, and Media facility (VCAM), housing the Visual Studies Minor, the Haverford Innovations Program, a Maker Arts Space, and the John B. Hurford '60 Center for the Arts and Humanities and its Philadelphia Area Creative Collaboratives Initiative. The project, designed by MSR Architects, earned a 2018 Education Facility Design Award of Excellence from the American Institute of Architects. The second phase of the college's Lives That Speak campaign involved a renovation of Magill Library, which began in Spring 2018 under the direction of Perry, Dean, Rogers Architects, and the library opened under the new name Lutnick Library in fall 2019.

=== Haverford College Arboretum ===
Comprising the entire campus, the Haverford College Arboretum is the oldest collegiate arboretum in the United States. In 1834, a year after the college's founding, the English landscape gardener William Carvill was hired to design the plan for the campus. Carvill developed a design to replace the tilled fields, woodlots and pastures, using trees to frame and complement open spaces. He bordered the lanes with alleés of trees and planted groups of trees in odd numbers. Carvill also constructed grape arbors and a serpentine walk, reflecting the English landscape tradition of Sir Humphrey Repton. Carvill's mark is still evident today in the pastoral landscape which includes several original trees including a Swamp white oak, Quercus bicolor, and Bur oak, Quercus macrocarpa, on Founders Green.

In 1901, a group of students and alumni formed the Campus Club to help preserve the campus landscape after discovering Carvill's original plan. Their work eventually led to the founding of the Haverford College Campus Arboretum Association (now the Haverford College Arboretum Association) in 1974, which continues to perpetuate Carvill's original design. To date, the arboretum's 216 acres (0.87 km^{2}) contain a nature trail distancing 2.2 miles, a pinetum with 300 different conifers, a duck pond, historic trees of diverse species, sculpture, as well as flower and Asian gardens.

montage of the Haverford duck pond through three months: October 1, 2007; November 21, 2007; December 6, 2007

=== Housing ===
Over 98% of the student body resides on campus, where housing options include apartments, themed community houses and traditional dormitories. Approximately 60% of faculty also reside on campus.

Themed housing options include La Casa, which "supports the endeavors of students actively engaged in organizing programs concerned with the cultures and civilizations of the Spanish-speaking world". First known as the "Spanish House", the building which hosted La Casa was located across Haverford's main campus on East Railroad Avenue. Originally built in 1911 as a home for Horace B. Forman Jr. and his wife, Elizabeth Chandlee Forman. The Philadelphia Quaker architect William L. Price designed and built the house from sketches provided by the Formans. Dr. H. Chandlee Forman, son of Horace and Elizabeth, donated the house to Haverford College in 1948. The house was eventually renamed to "La Casa", and served as the home to Haverford's spanish-speaking community until La Casa was moved to an on-campus building in 2021.

Other themed housing option include the Ira de A. Reid House, which seeks students active in the Black Students' League or members of the African Diaspora interested in the culture and politics of Africans; Cadbury house, which provides a substance-free and quiet living environment; and Yarnall, colloquially known as Nerd House, which hosts more introverted students who are fans of board and video games. Various housing and room arrangements exist, including suites of singles, doubles, and triples.

== Student life ==
=== Journalism ===
Student publications include The Bi-College News, a newspaper in collaboration with students at Bryn Mawr College that serves both campuses, The Clerk an independent, online newspaper, Milkweed, a student literary magazine (formerly known as The Haverford Review)

Former publications include Feathers & Fur, a fashion magazine also in collaboration with students at Bryn Mawr College (published 2009-2011), Without a (Noun), the Haverford satire/humor magazine (published 2005-2012), and Body Text, an academic journal (published 2011-2019).

== Athletics ==
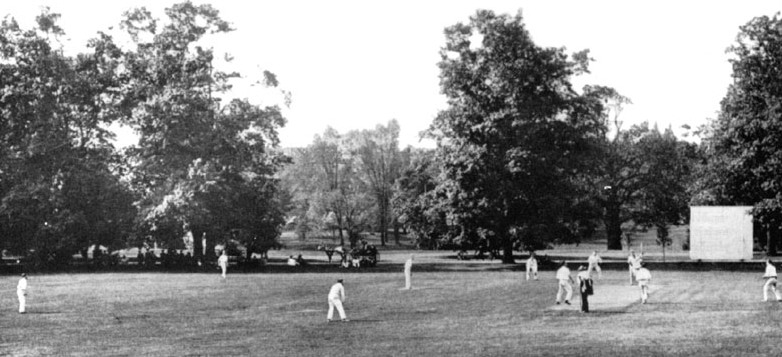
Cope Field at Haverford, Cricket Pitch (circa 1900)

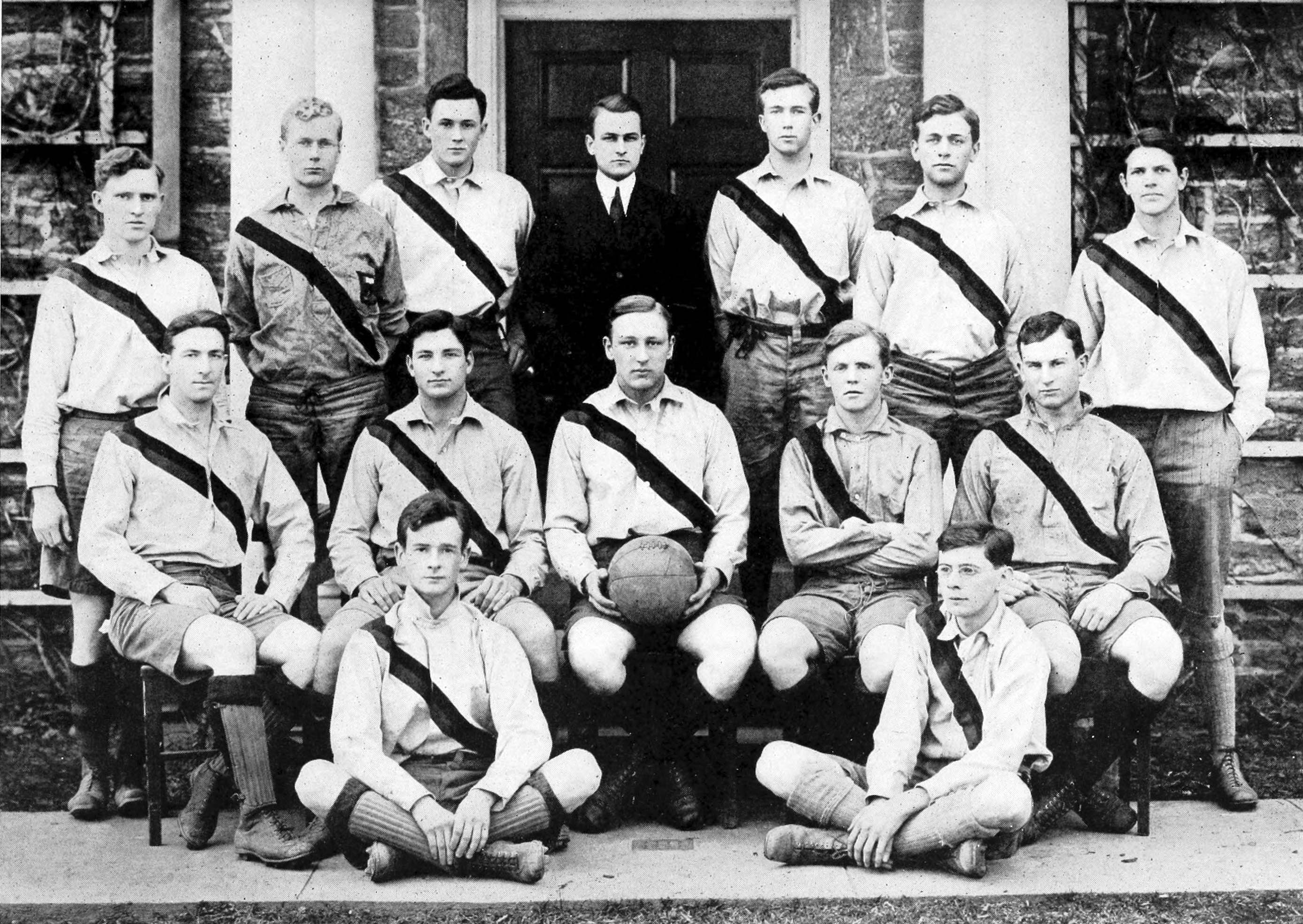
Haverford soccer team of 1910

Haverford College competes at the NCAA Division III level in the Centennial Conference.

Haverford has the only varsity cricket team in the United States. Cricket was first played at the college briefly in the late 1830s, and it returned in 1856. The Haverford team won The Intercollegiate Cricket Association (which existed from 1881 to 1924) championship 19 times.

The men's cross country won the 2010 Cross Country Division III National Championships.

Haverford's men's soccer team is among the nation's oldest, having won its first intercollegiate match in 1905 against Harvard College, and in 2015 made it to quarterfinals of the NCAA Division III Championships.

Haverford's fencing team has competed since the early 1930s and is a member of both the Middle Atlantic Collegiate Fencing Association (MACFA) and the National Intercollegiate Women's Fencing Association (NIWFA).

The women's basketball won the 2014 Centennial Conference Championship and progressed to the second round of the NCAA Division III women's basketball tournament. Women's softball also won Centennial Conference titles in 2006, 2014, and in 2016. The 2016 team advanced to the Super Regional tournament. The Men's Lacrosse team won the Centennial Conference Championship in 2010.

Despite the rest of the Centennial Conference choosing to play sports in the spring of 2021 (as well as their academic rivals in the NESCAC), Haverford decided to opt-out of competition due to COVID-19 concerns.

== Notable people ==
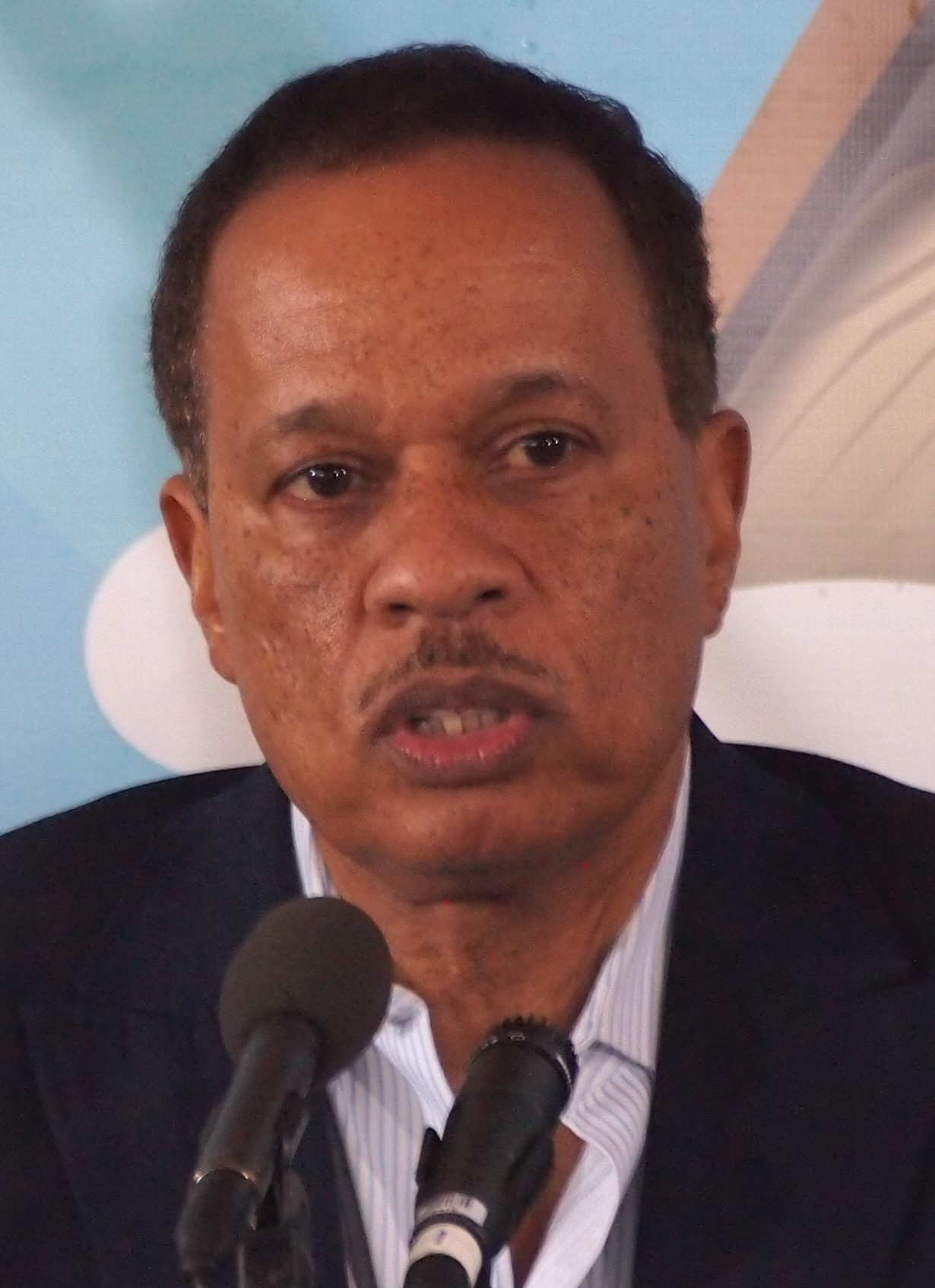
Juan Williams, journalist, author, and political analyst

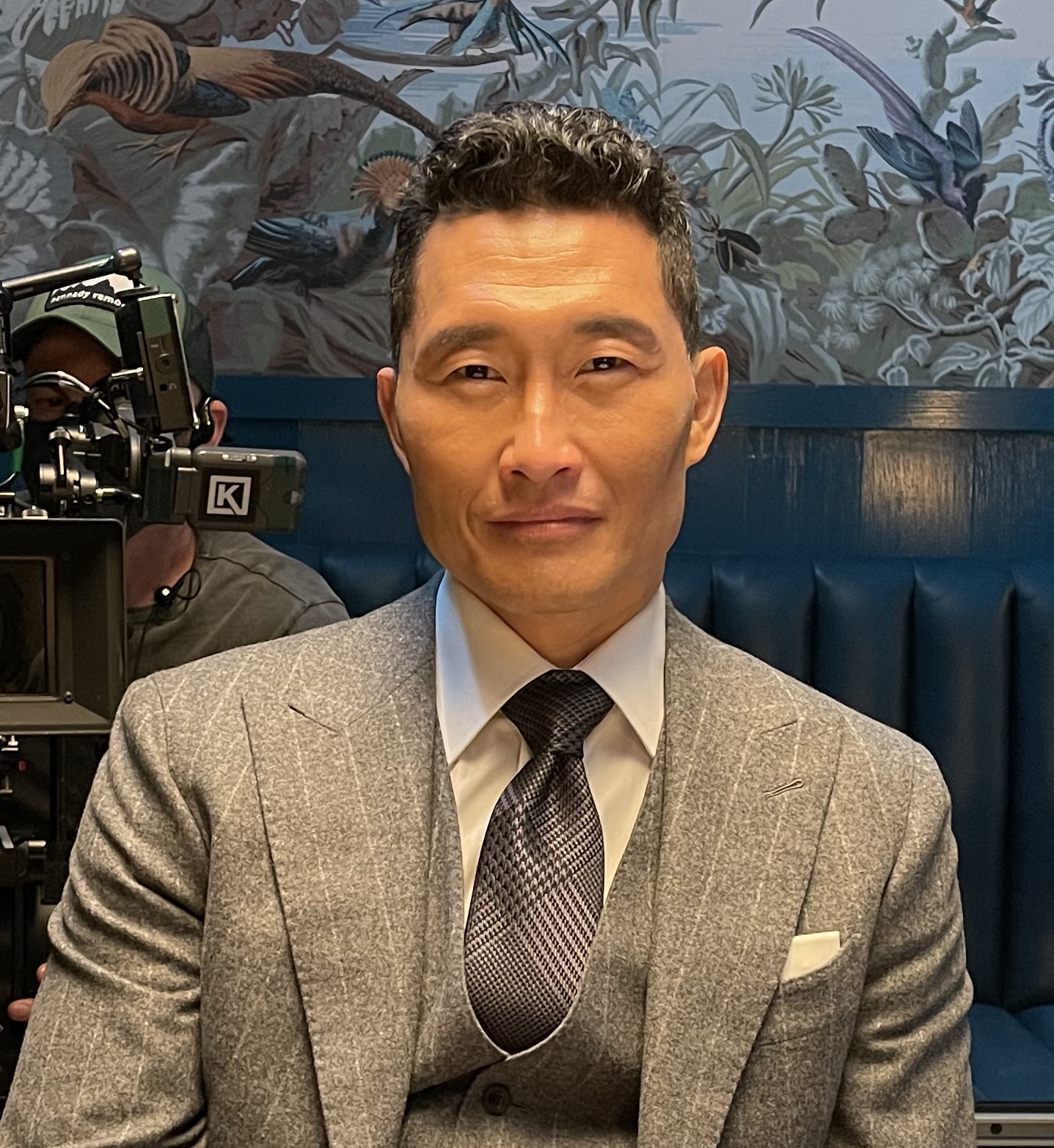
Daniel Dae Kim, actor and producer

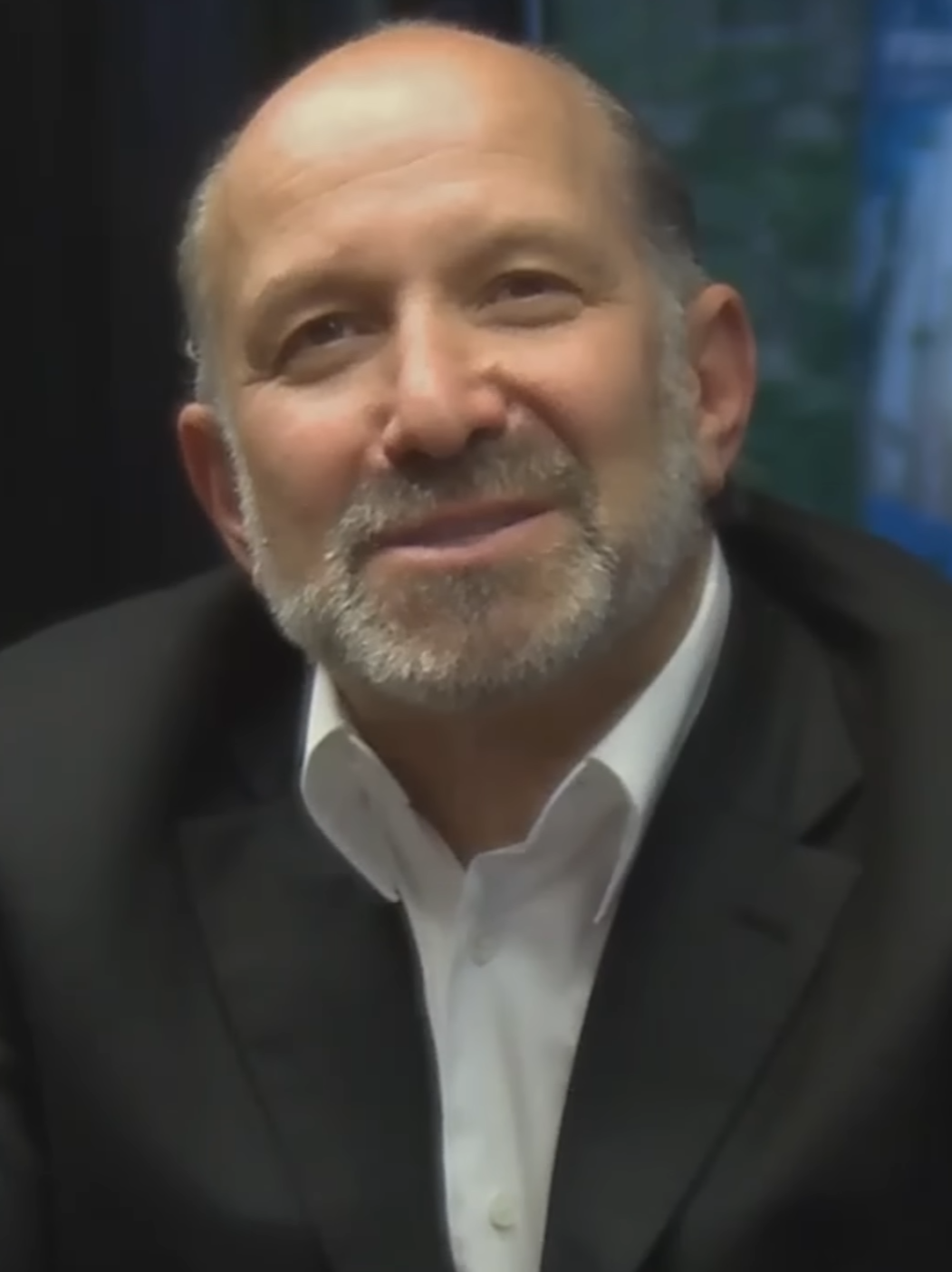
Howard Lutnick, businessman and United States Secretary of Commerce

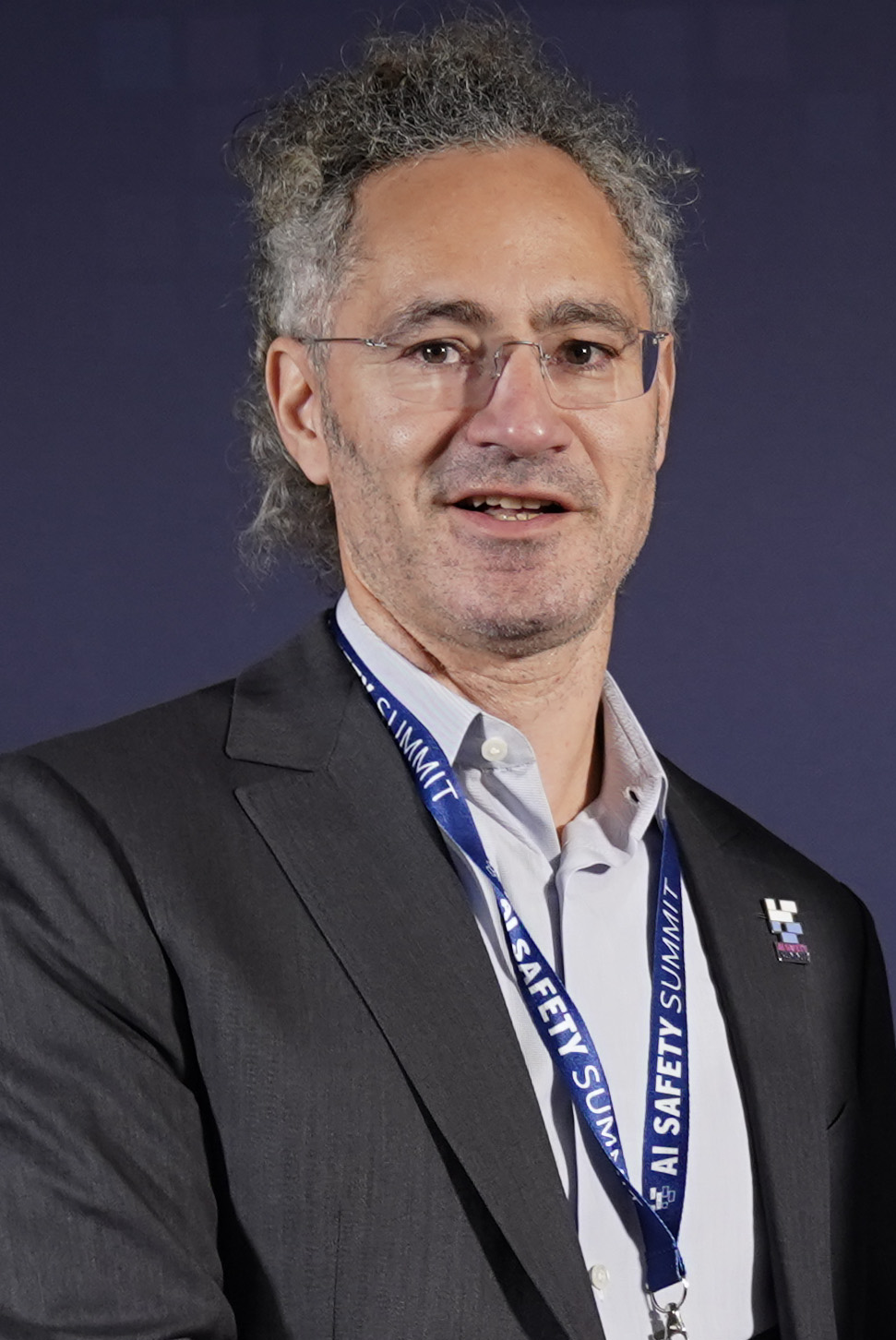
Alex Karp, Co-founder and CEO of Palantir Technologies

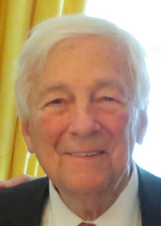
John C. Whitehead, banker and former US Deputy Secretary of State

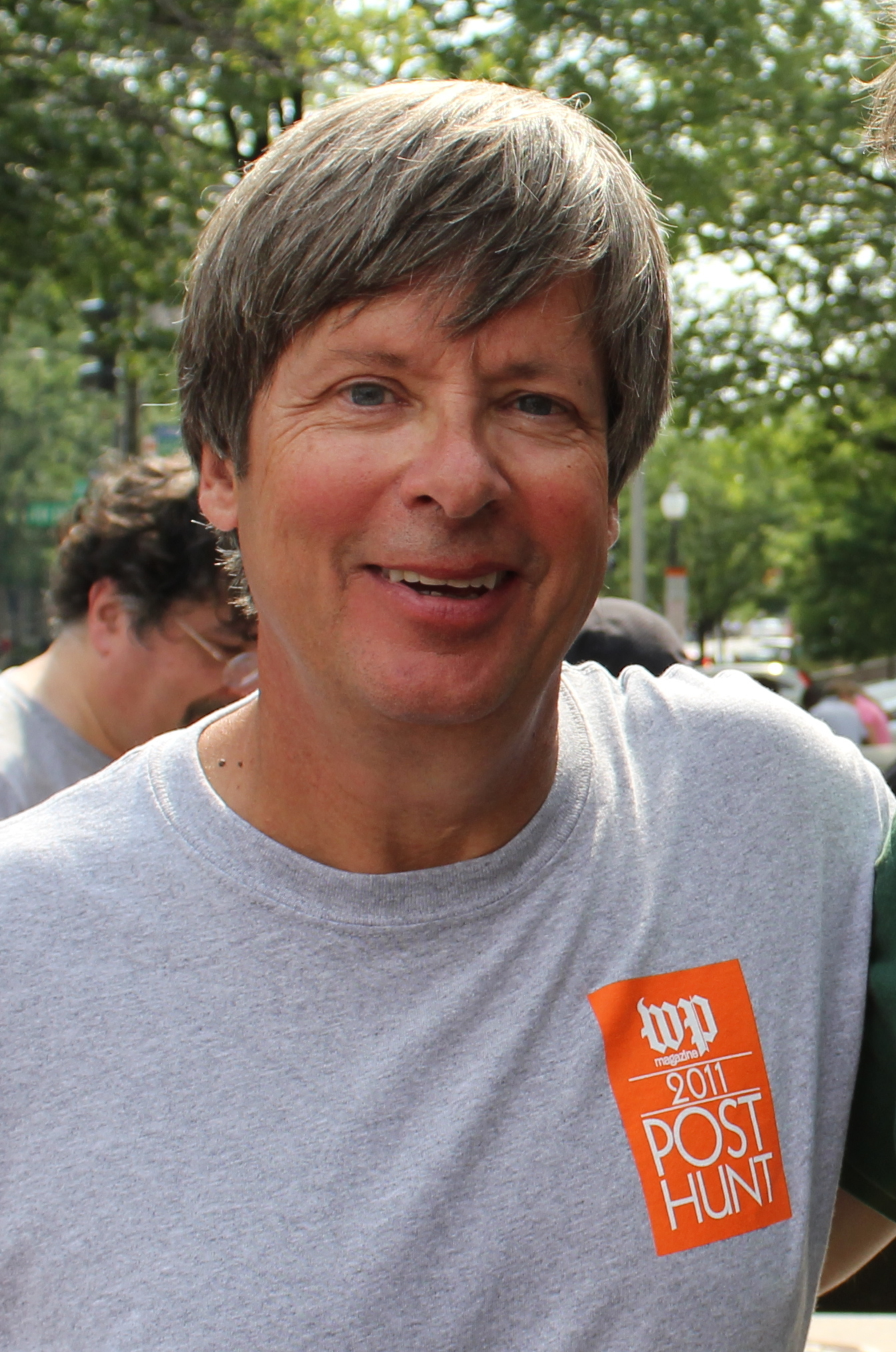
Dave Barry, author and columnist

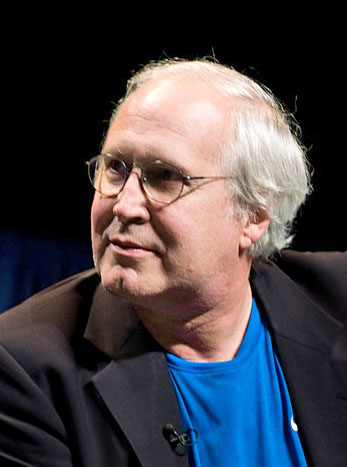
Chevy Chase, comedian

Among faculty, alumni, and associates are 4 Nobel Prize recipients, 6 Pulitzer Prize recipients, 20 Rhodes Scholars, and 85 Fulbright Scholars.

Notable graduates of Haverford College include a number of prominent businessmen such as Cantor Fitzgerald CEO and current United States Secretary of Commerce Howard Lutnick (1983), co-founder of MBK Partners Michael Kim (1985), Palantir Technologies co-founder and CEO Alex Karp (1989), and former co-chairman of Goldman Sachs and United States Deputy Secretary of State John C. Whitehead (1943). Haverford also counts among its alumni five Nobel Prize winners, including George Smith (1963), a co-recipient of the 2018 chemistry prize, and Nobel Peace Prize winner Philip Noel-Baker (1908), Emmy Award-winning journalist Juan Williams (1976), actor Daniel Dae Kim (1990), five winners of the Pulitzer Prize, including humor columnist Dave Barry (1969) and journalist David Wessel (1975), editor-in-chief of Harvard Business Review Adi Ignatius (1981), Tony Award-winning playwright of Lend Me a Tenor and Crazy for You Ken Ludwig (1972), composer Steven Gerber (1969), theoretical physicist Curtis Callan (1961), professional sports executive Arn Tellem (1976), former CEO of NPR Ken Stern (1985), tech entrepreneur James Kinsella (1982), Paddington Bear illustrator R.W. Alley (1979), and architect Gil Schafer III (1984).

Notable attendees who did not graduate include early 20th century artist and illustrator Maxfield Parrish, as well as actors Chevy Chase, Judd Nelson, and George Segal. Fictional FBI Special Agent Dale Cooper, from the television series Twin Peaks, was a member of the class of 1976.
