= Yale School of Architecture =

Architecture school of Yale University

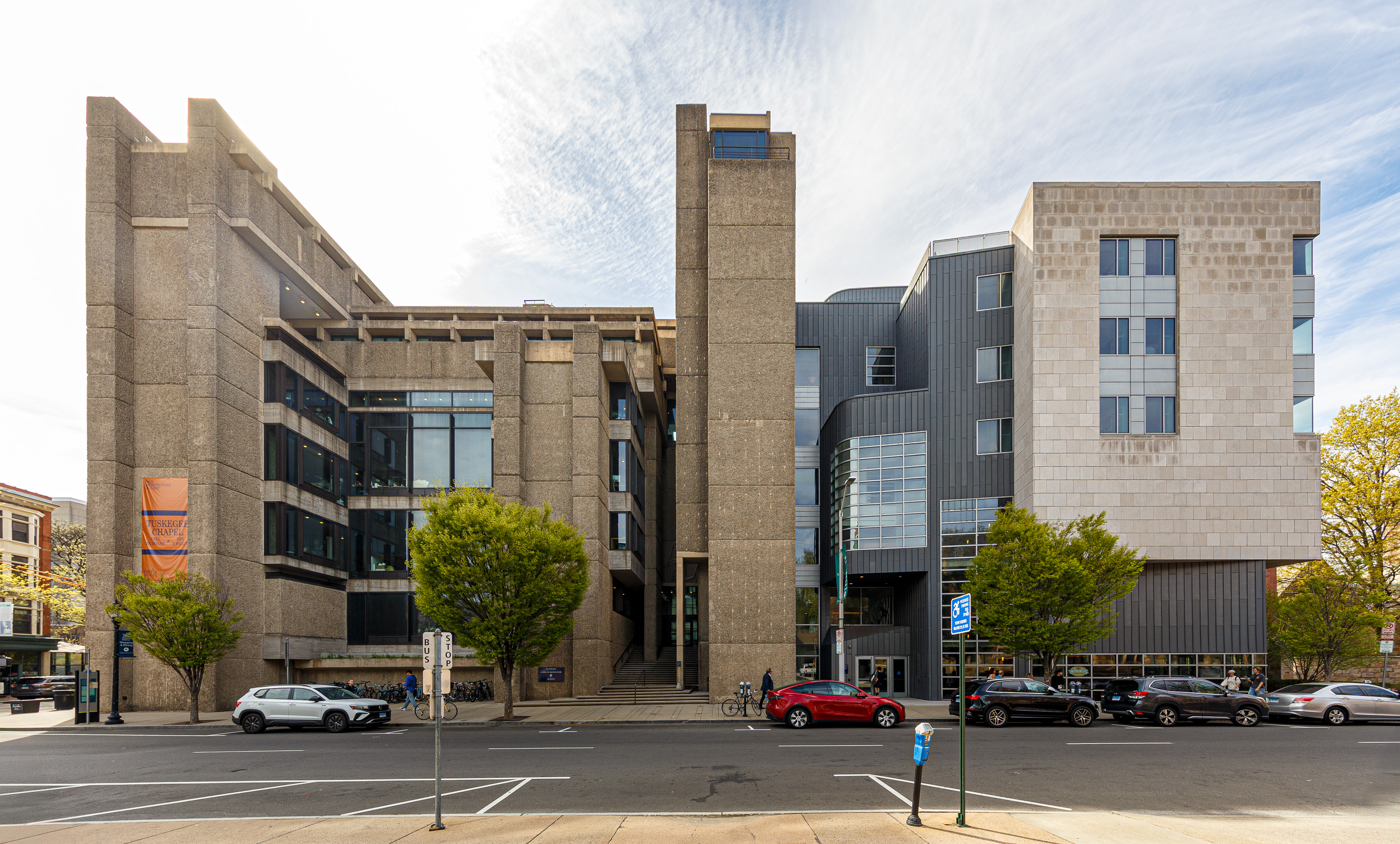
- Paul Rudolph Hall (L) and Jeffery H. Loria Center for the History of Art (R)
- Former names: Department of Architecture (1916–59); School of Art and Architecture (1959–72)
- Type: Private
- Established: 1916
- Affiliations: Yale University
- Dean: Deborah Berke
- Academic staff: 71
- Postgraduates: 202
- Doctoral students: 11 (GSAS)
- Location: New Haven, Connecticut, USA; 41°18′31″N 72°55′54″W
- Website: architecture.yale.edu

The Yale School of Architecture (YSoA) is the architecture school of Yale University in New Haven, Connecticut, US.

The School awards the degrees of Master of Architecture I (M.Arch I), Master of Architecture II (M.Arch II), Master of Environmental Design (M.E.D), and Ph.D in architectural history and criticism. The School also offers joint degrees with the Yale School of Management and Yale School of the Environment, as well as a course of study for undergraduates in Yale College leading to a Bachelor of Arts. Since its founding as a department in 1916, the School has produced some of the world's leading architects, including Norman Foster, Richard Rogers, Maya Lin and Eero Saarinen, among others. The current dean of the School is Deborah Berke.

The School of Architecture is housed in Rudolph Hall (also known as the Yale Art and Architecture Building), the Brutalist masterwork of former department chair Paul Rudolph.

== History ==
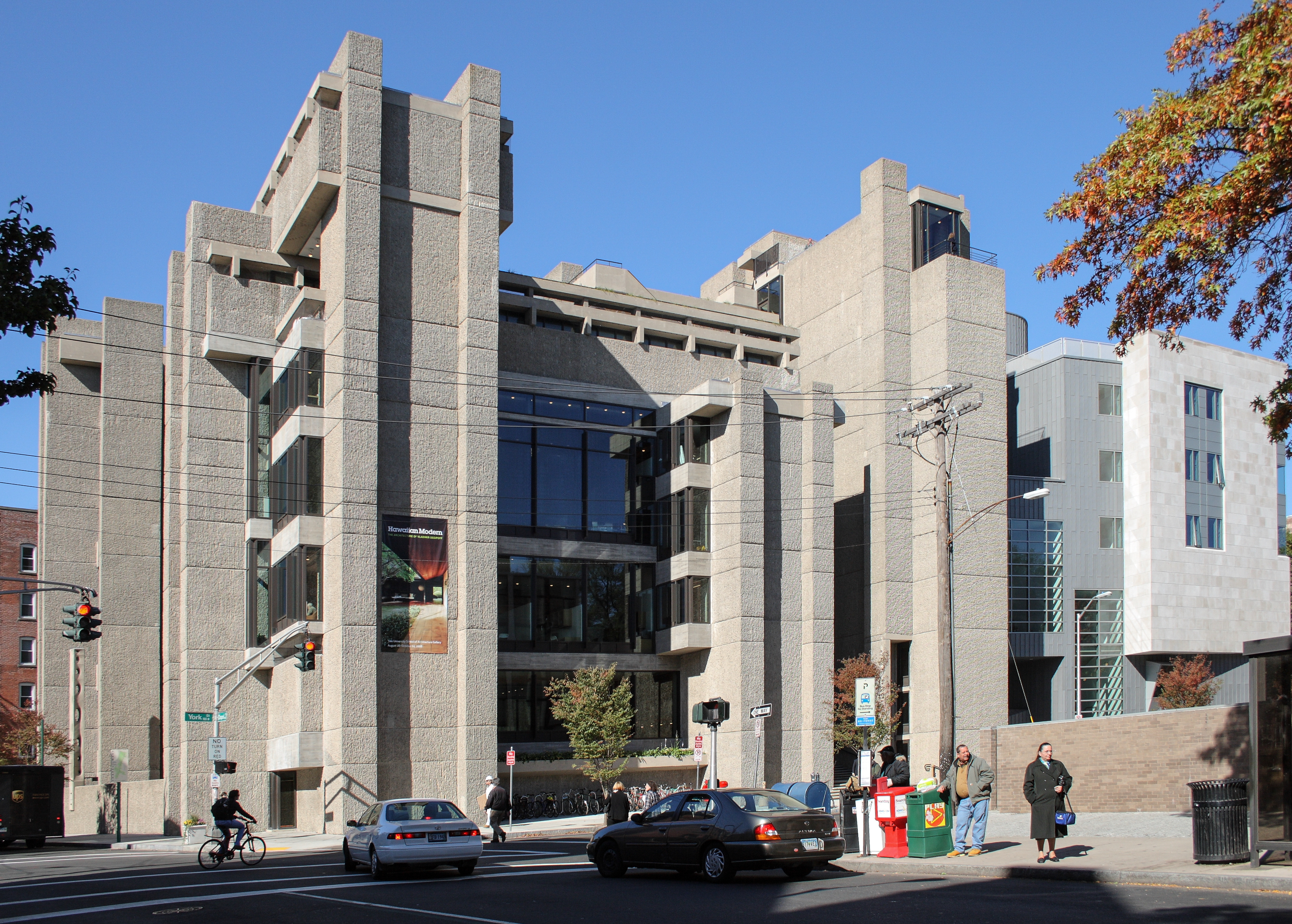
Rudolph Hall

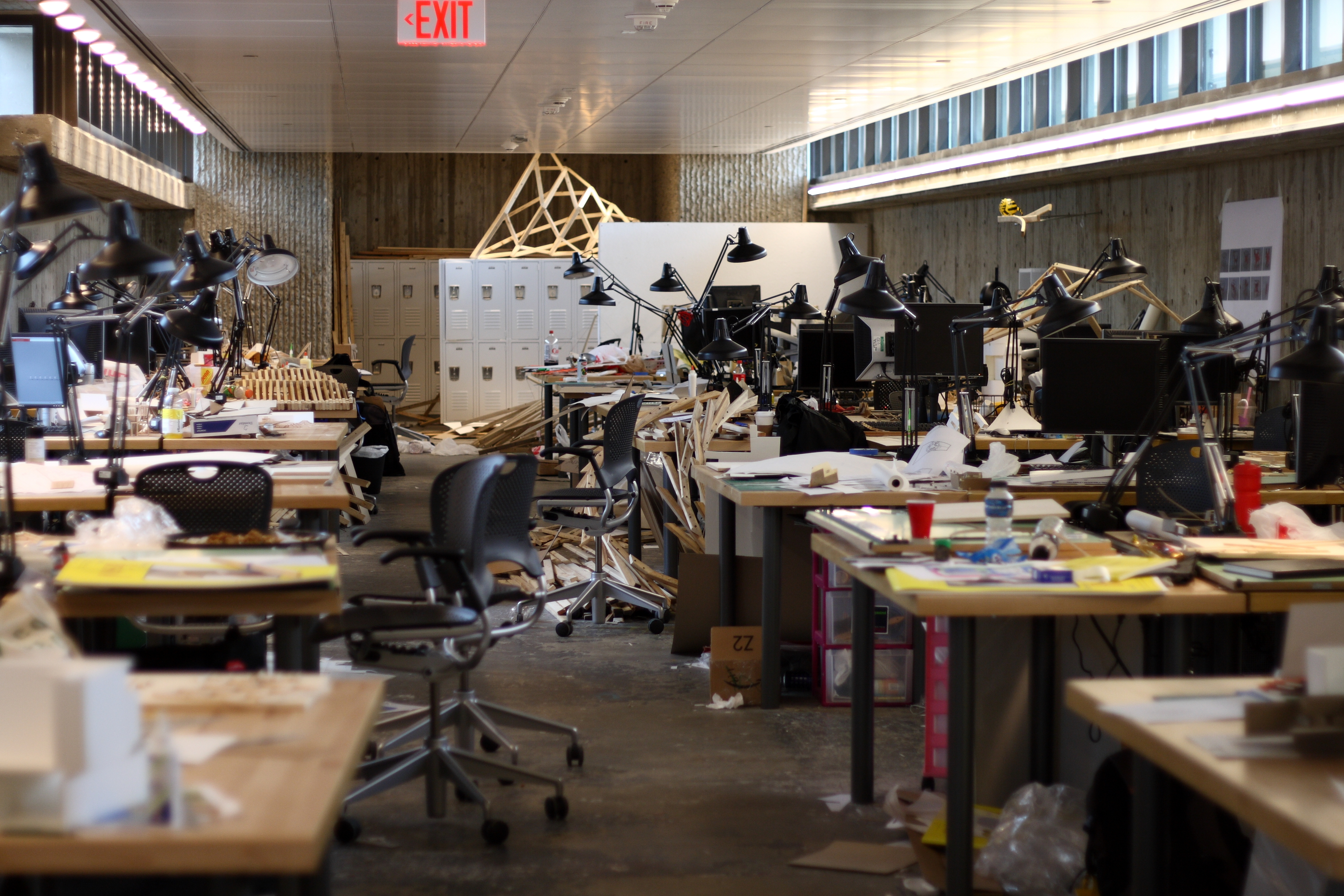
Student desks at the Yale School of Architecture, 2008

Yale's architecture programs are an outgrowth of a longstanding commitment to the teaching of the fine arts in the university. Before the School of Architecture was established, architecture was taught at the Yale School of Fine Arts as early as 1869. Even earlier, in 1832, Yale opened the Trumbull Art Gallery, the first college-affiliated gallery in the United States. In 1916, the Department of Architecture was established at the School of Fine Arts, and in 1959, the School of Art and Architecture, as it was then known, was made into a fully graduate professional school. In 1963, the School relocated to the newly built Yale Art and Architecture Building (now Rudolph Hall), designed by then Department Chair Paul Rudolph, where it has remained since. In 1972, the Yale School of Architecture became its own distinct professional school.

=== 2008 renovation and expansion ===
The Yale Art and Architecture Building was extensively renovated and expanded in 2008. The renovation team included New York architect, Yale alumnus, and Rudolph mentee Charles Gwathmey. The interior and exterior renovation restored the structure to its "original 1963 intention," including historically correct windows and upgrades to lighting and furnishings. The expansion included building an adjacent seven-story History of Art Building, which contains an enlarged Art and Architecture Library, classrooms, seminar rooms, lecture halls, faculty offices, lounge, and public café.

At this time the Art and Architecture Building was renamed the Rudolph Building in honor of Paul Rudolph. The 87,000 square foot addition was named the Jeffrey H. Loria Center for the History of Art, named for donor Jeffrey Loria.

== Programs ==
The School awards the degrees of Master of Architecture I, a three-year professional degree for students holding undergraduate liberal arts degrees; Master of Architecture II, a two-year post-professional degree for students holding a professional degree in architecture; Master of Environmental Design, a nonprofessional research-based degree; and Doctor of Philosophy in architectural history and criticism. The School also offers joint-degree programs with the School of Management and School of Forestry. Additionally, a course of study for undergraduates in Yale College leads to a Bachelor of Arts.

Yale's core program has always stressed design as a fundamental discipline. While initially associated with Beaux Arts pedagogy, the school adopted a close affiliation with other modes of fine art, including sculpture, graphic design, painting and furniture design. One of its most illustrious early graduates, Eero Saarinen, produced a wide variety of student projects ranging from medals and currency to campus and monumental buildings. When the Art and Architecture Building became its home, Paul Rudolph's design reflected this close integration between various fine art departments. The Graphic Design department consistently contributed to architecture posters, publications and exhibits, particularly to Perspecta, Yale's ground-breaking student journal.

Another distinguishing element in the Yale core program has been the Yale Building Project, a first-year studio and summer program. Particularly under Dean Charles W. Moore, first-year students were pushed to design small buildings that ameliorated the life of poor or disadvantaged Americans, working as VISTA volunteers in the Appalachia. In later years the program focused more on New Haven and Southern Connecticut. A recent book on the subject documents the extraordinary breadth and significance of the work produced by students, many of whom went on to become renowned architects and educators.

Yale's M.E.D., one of the first of its kind, made it possible for architects and planners to pursue a wide range of research connected to the betterment of the entire environment. Only recently have the design professions embraced this wider field of study, spurred by the movement towards sustainability and inter-disciplinarity. Notable recipients of the degree included William J. Mitchell, later dean at MIT, and Steven Izenour, a partner with Venturi, Scott Brown Associates.

The Yale Urban Design Workshop is a community design center affiliated with the Yale School of Architecture. It was established in 1992 by School of Architecture professor Alan Plattus, who directs the workshop with Andrei Harwell.

== Rankings ==
DesignIntelligence's ten-year median ranking places the program 3rd. As of August 2022, the Yale School of Architecture has opted out of the annual Design Intelligence ranking system. Citing that: "However well-intentioned they may be, we believe that the DI rankings have the potential to create a disservice to the public." Joining Dean Deborah Berke in abandoning this system of ranking was Dean Sarah Whiting of the Harvard Graduate School of Design, Dean Mónica Ponce de León of Princeton, and Dean Hashim Sarkis of MIT.

== Publications ==
The school maintains an active publications program. It supports two student-edited journals, Perspecta and Retrospecta; a biannual news magazine, Constructs. Perspecta is the oldest student-edited peer-reviewed architectural journal in the United States. The school also publishes books.

== Noted faculty and alumni ==
=== Alumni ===
- Constance Adams
- Louise Braverman
- Peter Calthorpe
- David Childs
- John Connell
- Peter Corrigan
- Lise Anne Couture
- Edward D. Dart
- Andrés Duany^{#}
- Norman Foster^{†}
- Mark Foster Gage
- Alexander Garvin
- Paul Goldberger
- Charles Gwathmey
- Siamak Hariri
- Mark Alan Hewitt
- Lance Hosey
- Muzharul Islam
- Steven Izenour
- Blair Kamin
- Richard Kelly
- Johannes Knoops
- Thomas Kligerman
- Maya Lin
- MJ Long
- Tom Luckey
- Yansong Ma
- William McDonough
- Scott Merrill^{#}
- William J. Mitchell
- Thomas E. Moore
- George Nelson
- Elizabeth Plater-Zyberk^{#}
- James Polshek
- Tim Prentice
- Jaquelin T. Robertson^{#}
- Richard Rogers^{†}
- Eero Saarinen
- Ong-ard Satrabhandhu^{#}
- Gil Schafer III
- David M. Schwarz^{#}
- David Sellers
- Adam Sokol
- Robert A. M. Stern^{#}
- Stanley Tigerman
- Alexander Tzonis
- Marion Weiss
- Ross Wimer
- Evans Woollen III

=== Present faculty members ===
- Emily Abruzzo
- Anthony Acciavatti
- Annie Barrett
- Deborah Berke (Dean)
- Philip Bernstein
- Tatiana Bilbao
- Trattie Davies
- Peggy Deamer
- Anna Dyson
- Keller Easterling
- Peter Eisenman
- Mark Foster Gage
- David Gissen
- Andrei Harwell
- Dolores Hayden
- Momoyo Kaijima
- Francis Kéré^{†}
- Mae-ling Lokko
- Eeva-Liisa Pelkonen
- Alan Plattus
- Elihu Rubin
- David M. Schwarz^{#}
- Billie Tsien
- Ife Vanable

=== Former faculty members ===
- David Adjaye
- Hernan Diaz Alonso
- Tadao Ando^{†}
- Cecil Balmond
- Thomas H. Beeby^{#}, Dean*, 1985–1992
- Mario Botta
- Tatiana Bilbao
- Kent Bloomer^{†}
- Santiago Calatrava
- Serge Chermayeff*
- David Chipperfield
- Andrés Duany^{#}
- Frida Escobedo
- Liza Fior
- Buckminster Fuller
- Alexander Garvin
- Frank Gehry^{†}
- Zaha Hadid^{†}
- Charles Holland
- Hugh Hardy
- Louise Harpman
- Michael Haverland
- John Hejduk
- Hans Hollein^{†}
- Walter Hood
- Bjarke Ingels
- Helmut Jahn
- Bijoy Jain
- Philip Johnson^{†}
- Louis Kahn
- Diébédo Francis Kéré^{†}
- Hans Kollhoff
- Leon Krier^{#}
- Daniel Libeskind
- Greg Lynn
- Winy Maas
- Thom Mayne^{†}
- Richard Meier^{†}
- Samuel Mockbee
- Charles Willard Moore*
- Eric Owen Moss
- Glenn Murcutt^{†}
- Enrique Norten
- César Pelli*
- Emmanuel Petit
- Thomas Phifer
- Joshua Prince-Ramus
- Demetri Porphyrios^{#}
- George Ranalli
- Richard Rogers^{†}
- Paul Rudolph*
- Moshe Safdie
- Patrik Schumacher
- Massimo Scolari
- Vincent Scully
- Brigitte Shim
- Michael Sorkin
- Robert A. M. Stern^{#}, Dean, 1998–2016
- James Stirling^{†}
- Bernard Tschumi
- Billie Tsien
- Robert Venturi^{†}
- Stanislaus von Moos
- Tom Wiscombe
- Shadrach Woods
- King-lui Wu
- Alejandro Zaera-Polo
- Elia Zenghelis

*Indicates former deans of the separate School of Architecture (1972–present) or chairmen of the former Department of Architecture (part of the School of Fine Arts from 1916 and the School of Art and Architecture from 1959)
^{†}Indicates Priztker Prize laureate
^{#}Indicates Driehaus Prize laureate
