= G. P. Schafer Architect =

American architectural firm

- Industry: Architecture
- Founded: New York City, New York, United States (2002)
- Founder: Gil Schafer III
- Headquarters: New York City
- Area served: International
- Key people: Gil Schafer III
- Services: Architecture, Interior design
- Number of employees: 35
- Website: G. P. Schafer Architect

G. P. Schafer Architect is a New York City-based architectural firm established in 2002 and led by founder and principal Gil Schafer III. The firm's work has been published in numerous magazines and journals such as Architectural Digest, Town & Country, and Veranda, in The New York Times, and in books on classical architecture, residential design, historic restoration, and interior design.

G. P. Schafer Architect has won Institute of Classical Architecture & Art (ICAA), Palladio and American Institute of Architects awards, as well as the Veranda "Art of Design" Award in Architecture. Rizzoli International has published two books by Gil Schafer, The Great American House (2012) and A Place to Call Home (2017).

G. P. Schafer Architect, Middlefield, Dutchess County, New York, 1999

== History ==
Gil Schafer III (born 1961 in Cleveland) founded G. P. Schafer Architect in 2002 in New York City. The firm occupied space in a SoHo high-rise on Lafayette Street for several years, and by 2007, had executed 25 projects with a staff that had grown to fifteen. By 2018, its staff numbered thirty-five, and the practice took over a fourth-floor aerie on Union Square West in Manhattan.

Schafer is the grandson and great, great-grandson of architects. He studied Growth & Structure of Cities at Haverford College and Bryn Mawr (BA, 1984), before attending Yale School of Architecture (MA, 1988). At Yale, he trained as a modernist under Thomas Beeby, Frank Gehry, Josef Paul Kleihues, Bernard Tschumi and Robert Venturi, and earned the school's H. I. Feldman Prize for studio work in his final semester.

As a student, Schafer worked for Charles Moore and William Turnbull Jr., and upon graduating, for Bernard Tschumi. He joined Ferguson Shamamian & Rattner in 1991, working there until 1999, when he started his own practice. Between 1999 and 2006, he was president, and then chairman, of the Institute of Classical Architecture & Art. Schafer writes and lectures on traditional residential architecture, and has served on Yale School of Architecture's Dean's Council, the Dutchess Land Conservancy, and the Thomas Jefferson Foundation.

== Projects ==
G. P. Schafer Architect is known for what writers call "new old houses"; contemporary adaptations of classical styles suggesting long histories and regional authenticity, and the restorations of historic homes. The firm's influences include 18th and 19th century American design movements and figures such as Colonial Revival architects Charles A. Platt and William Lawrence Bottomley, Sir Edwin Lutyens, and David Adler and Frances Adler Elkins.

G. P. Schafer Architect, Longfield Farm, Dutchess County, New York, 2006

=== "New old houses" ===
Schafer's early project, "Middlefield" (Dutchess County, New York, 1999), demonstrated the "new old house" approach. Following an unsuccessful attempt to find a suitable nineteenth-century Greek Revival house to renovate, Schafer designed and built a new, modern rendition on a 45-acre land parcel. The residence combined contemporary features and regional farmhouse vernacular, with classically proportioned details derived from 19th century builder pattern books by Asher Benjamin and Minard Lafever, with a two-story Greek Doric columned entry portico.

In 2006, "Longfield Farm" (Dutchess County, New York) was described by Architectural Digest as embodying "a picturesque historical narrative" of successive additions—Colonial Revival main house of rugged fieldstone, Federal-style wing, neo-Victorian carriage barn, and Greek Revival entry portico and back porch—blended into a "transcendent whole."

2016's "New Plantation Residence" (South Georgia) combined an "original" mid-19th-century Greek Revival structure with a mock 1930s Colonial Revival hunting lodge addition.

G. P. Schafer Architect, William C. Gatewood House, Charleston, South Carolina, 2008

=== Restorations & renovations ===
The firm executed a four-year restoration of the 1843 Greek Revival "William C. Gatewood House" (Charleston, 2008), a four-story residence in the antebellum Charleston single house style.

In 2010, the Georgian farmhouse "Boxwood" (Nashville) involved work on a residence designed by American classicist Charles A. Platt.

G. P. Schafer Architect, House by the Sea, Brooklin, Maine, 2017

The "House by the Sea" in Brooklin, Maine was renovated in 2017, moving away from Schafer's typical historical designs to a modern style. Originally a nondescript early-1990s chalet, the structure was extensively modified. The renovation included larger windows, sliding glass doors, and dormer windows to optimize views of Blue Hill Bay. Its white-painted interior features traditional New England wood-plank walls and a mix of furnishings from various periods.

=== Additional residences ===
Schafer's book, A Place to Call Home, delved into design's relationship with geography and lifestyle. Notable projects on this theme include:

1. "Waterfront House in the Adirondacks" (Lake Placid, New York, 2013) a modern interpretation on the Gilded-Age family compound with an Adirondack-style exterior featuring brown clapboard siding, green-shingled roof, and white trim.
2. "Mill Valley Hillside Residence" (California, 2013) transformed an old 1880s YWCA bunkhouse on a sloped plot into a contemporary cottage.
3. "Greenwich Village Townhouse Apartment" (2003): a restored 1850s residence that had modernist modifications, restoring its historical style and introducing a contemporary layout.
4. "Fifth Avenue Apartment" (2016) merged classic architectural features, such as a columned entry overlooking Central Park, with a casual, open layout, modern hues, and space for a modern art collection. The firm's urban designs aim to merge traditional and modern, balancing sophistication with comfort.

== Awards and recognition ==
G. P. Schafer Architect has received awards, including:

Institute of Classical Architecture & Art (ICAA) Awards

- Arthur Ross Award (2019)

Stanford White Awards

- Longfield Farm (2013)
- Fifth Avenue Apartment (2013)
- New York Historical Society Library (Interior Design and Decoration Award, 2014)
- Thorndale Farm Corporate Offices in collaboration with Voith & Mactavish Architects (Commercial, Civic and Institutional Architecture Award, 2016).

American Institute of Architects (AIA) Awards

- New York State Award of Merit: William C. Gatewood House (2009)
- Westchester/Hudson Valley Citation Award: Willow Grace Farm (2009)

Palladio Awards

- Thorndale Farm Corporate Offices (2018)
- Willow Grace Farm (2009)
- Greenwich Village Townhouse Apartment (2004)
- Middlefield (2002)

== Publications ==
Schafer has written two books, The Great American House (2012) and A Place to Call Home (2017). He has also contributed forewords to The New Old House by Marc Kristal (2016) and Thomasville: History, Home and Southern Hospitality by William R. Mitchell (2014), a chapter to Bunny Williams's A House by the Sea (2016), and a section to the Institute of Classical Architecture & Art book, A Decade of Art & Architecture 1992–2002 (2002).
