= Michael Haverland =

- Occupation: Architect
- Practice: Michael Haverland Architect, P.C. New York City, USA

Michael Haverland is an architect based in New York City and East Hampton, New York. His work includes residential, retail, commercial, institutional and urban design projects. He collaborated with Calvin Klein on the design of a new house in Southampton, New York.

Michael taught at the Yale School of Architecture for ten years, and coordinated the Yale Urban Design Workshop, a community design center. His work has been widely published, with features in The New York Times, the Architecture issue of Architectural Digest, Architectural Record, New York magazine, as well as several books. The firm has also been recognized with local and national design awards.

== Select projects ==
=== Completed ===
==== Residential ====
- Apartment, Upper East Side, New York, NY
- Apartment, Upper West Side, New York, NY
- Billboard, East Hampton, NY
- Duplex Apartment, New York NY
- Duplex Apartment, Upper West Side, New York, NY
- Duplex Loft, New York, NY
- Garden Pavilion, New York, NY
- House, East Hampton, NY
- House, Shelter Island, NY
- New York Dems, Democratic National Convention, 2008
- Pool and Garden, East Hampton, NY
- Townhouse, Gramercy Park, New York, NY
- Townhouse Garden, Upper East Side, New York, NY
- Wall House, Southampton, NY
- Waterfront House, East Hampton, NY
- Waterfront House Two, East Hampton, NY
- William Cody House Restoration, Palm Springs, CA

==== Civic/Retail ====
- ArtSpace Gallery, New Haven, CT
- Elementary School Addition, New Haven, CT
- Lovett Gallery, Museum of Fine Arts, Houston, TX
- Robert Marc Headquarters/Showroom, New York, NY
- Tod's Retail Concepts, Global Locations

==== In progress ====
- Artist’s Campus, East Hampton, NY
- House, Beverly Hills, CA
- House, East Hampton, NY
- House and Property Renovation, Sagaponack, NY
- Oceanfront House, Southampton, NY
- Triplex Penthouse Apartment, New York, NY
- Waterfront House, East Hampton, NY
- Waterfront House, Southampton, NY
- Working Eco-farm and Studio, Hudson, NY

== Design awards ==
Michael Haverland Architect, PC has been recognized with numerous design awards from the American Institute of Architects (New York and Connecticut chapters), the Congress for the New Urbanism, the Association of Collegiate Schools of Architecture, and the Brick Industry Association.

== Bibliography ==
- Johnson, Paul A., “Architect’s Own, Check Out Michael Haverland’s ‘Modern Yet Cozy’ EH Abode,” Curbed Hamptons, (hamptons.curbed.com), August 7, 2012. (link to article)
- Greene, Baylis, “Open But Enclosed, For All Seasons,” The East Hampton Star, August 2, 2012, p. Aa1, Aa3. (link to article)
- Barbanel, Josh, “Luxury Units Hitting Highs With Buyers,” The Wall Street Journal, September 23, 2011, p. A22.
- Polsky, Sara, “Sold Stuff, Stone Phillips Flips Gramercy Penthouse for $5.7 Million,” Curbed New York, (ny.curbed.com), September 22, 2011. (link to article)
- Khan, Bilal, “Flipping Out, Are Stone Phillips' Renovation Plans Worth an Extra $1M?” Curbed New York, (ny.curbed.com), May 25, 2011. (link to article)
- Margolies, Jane, “All the World’s a Stage,” Interior Design, September 2010, pp. 214–223. (link to article)
- Aronson, Steven M.L., “House of Contrasts,” Architectural Digest, October 2009, pp. 176–183. (link to article)
- Hart, Sara, “Eavesdroplet: A Case of Turrets Syndrome,” The Architect’s Newspaper, NY 15, September 23, 2009. (link to article)
- Aurichio, Andrea, “Say Goodbye To Dragon Head, Say Hello To Calvin’s New Beach House,” Hamptons.com, (www.hamptons.com), September 8, 2009. (link to article)
- O’Reilly, Brendan, “An Inglorious Death for the Controversial Dragon,” The Southampton Press, May 28, 2009, pp. A1, A9. (link to article)
- “His Home Was (Once) His Castle,” Newsday, May 21, 2009.
- Goodman, Wendy, “It’s Listed at $19.5 Million,” New York Magazine, April 13, 2009, pp. 44–49. (link to article)
- Aurichio, Andrea, “Dragon Head Is Approved For Demolition Marking End To Era Of Excess; Enter Klein's Minimalism,” Hamptons.com, (www.hamptons.com), February 18, 2009. (link to article)
- O’Reilly, Brendan, “ARB Okays Dragon’s Head Demolition,” The Southampton Press, February 12, 2008, p. A5. (link to article)
- Finn, Robin, “From Monstrosity to Teardown,” The New York Times, February 1, 2009, pp. L1, L2. (link to article)
- Spanburgh, Sally, “Calvin’s New House,” Southampton Village Review, (shvillagereview.blogspot.com), December 29, 2008. (link to article)
- O’Reilly, Brendan, “The Dragon Could Soon Fall,” The Southampton Press, December 18, 2008, pp. A1, A9. (link to article)
- McCully, Martha, “RSVP: Novel Approach,” Elle Décor, October 2008, p. 118.
- Green, Penelope, “Architect Spices Up the Look of New York’s Democratic Convention Delegation,” The New York Times, August 21, 2008, p. F3. (link to article)
- Sokol, David, “Robert Marc Headquarters,” Architectural Record, (www.architecturalrecord.com), June 2008. (link to article)
- Prinzing, Debra, “Light Fantastic,” Stylish Sheds and Elegant Hideaways: Big Ideas for Small Backyard Destinations, New York: Clarkson Potter, April 2008, pp. 196–203.
- Green, Penelope, “Starting Over, and Over, and Over,” The New York Times, January 24, 2008, pp. F1, F6. (link to article)
- Steinberg, Claudia, “Das Haus Für Einen Tisch” Architektur & Wohnen, February–March 2007, pp. 93–100.
- Coleman, Brian D., “Inspired By Contest: East Hampton,” Old-House Interiors, November 2006, pp. 68–74.
- Lind, Diana, Designing the Hamptons: Portraits of Interiors, New York: Edizioni Press, July 2006, pp. 227–245.
- Bernstein, Fred A., “Modern to the Max,” Hamptons Cottages and Gardens, June 1–15, 2006, pp. 104–111.
- Lange, Alexandra, “All Clear,” New York Magazine, May 29, 2006, pp. 46–49. (link to article)
- Sokol, David, “Piece by Piece: Deconstructing Michael Haverland,” Elements of Living, October 2005, pp. 39–42.
- Weathersby, William, Jr., “Timothy Dwight Elementary School,” Architectural Record: Review, October 2005, pp. 20–25.
- D. L., “Kitchen & Bath Portfolio: Creating a New Modern Vocabulary for the Intimate Spaces of an East Hampton Residence,” Architectural Record, July 2005, p. 226.
- Nayar, Jean, “Street Smart,” Contract, July 2005, pp. 64–67.
- Rogers, Teri Karush, “A Wall to Enlighten, Not Obstruct,” The New York Times, July 6, 2005, p. C8. (link to article)
- Barreneche, Raul A., “The House That Homework Built,” The New York Times, August 5, 2004, pp. F1, F6. (link to article)
- Weathersby, William, Jr., “Timothy Dwight Elementary School,” Architectural Record, February 2002, pp. 104–107.
- "Architecture Award: Addition to the Timothy Dwight Elementary School," Oculus, December 2001, p. 18.
- Iovine, Julie V., “The Go-Getter's Guide to Better Nesting,” The New York Times, September, November 2, 2000, pp. F1, F10. (link to article)
