= Perspecta (journal) =

Perspecta: The Yale Architectural Journal
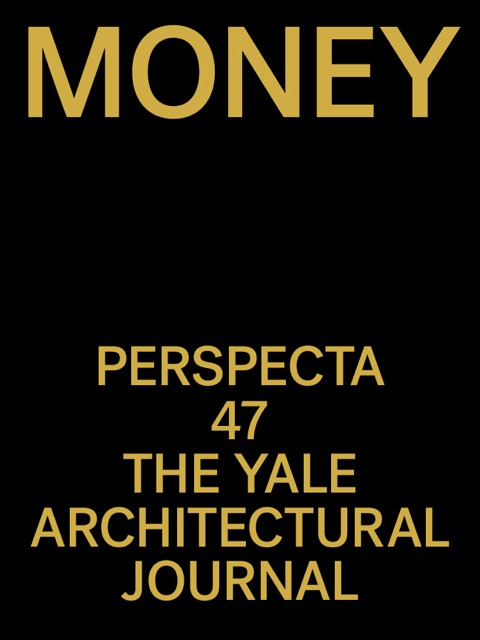
- Front cover of issue 47 (2014) of Perspecta: The Yale Architectural Journal
- Discipline: Architecture
- Language: English

Publication details
- History: 1952-present
- Publisher: MIT Press for the Yale School of Architecture (US)
- Frequency: Annually

Standard abbreviations
- ISO 4: Perspecta

Indexing
- ISSN: 0079-0958
- JSTOR: 00790958
- OCLC no.: 62483181

Links
- Journal homepage

Perspecta: The Yale Architectural Journal is a peer-reviewed academic journal published since 1952 by the Yale School of Architecture and distributed by the MIT Press. Graduate students are competitively chosen to edit each issue. It is the oldest architectural journal of its kind in the United States. Contributors include some of the most important figures in contemporary architecture worldwide.
