= Jorge Otero-Pailos =

American architect and artist (born 1971)

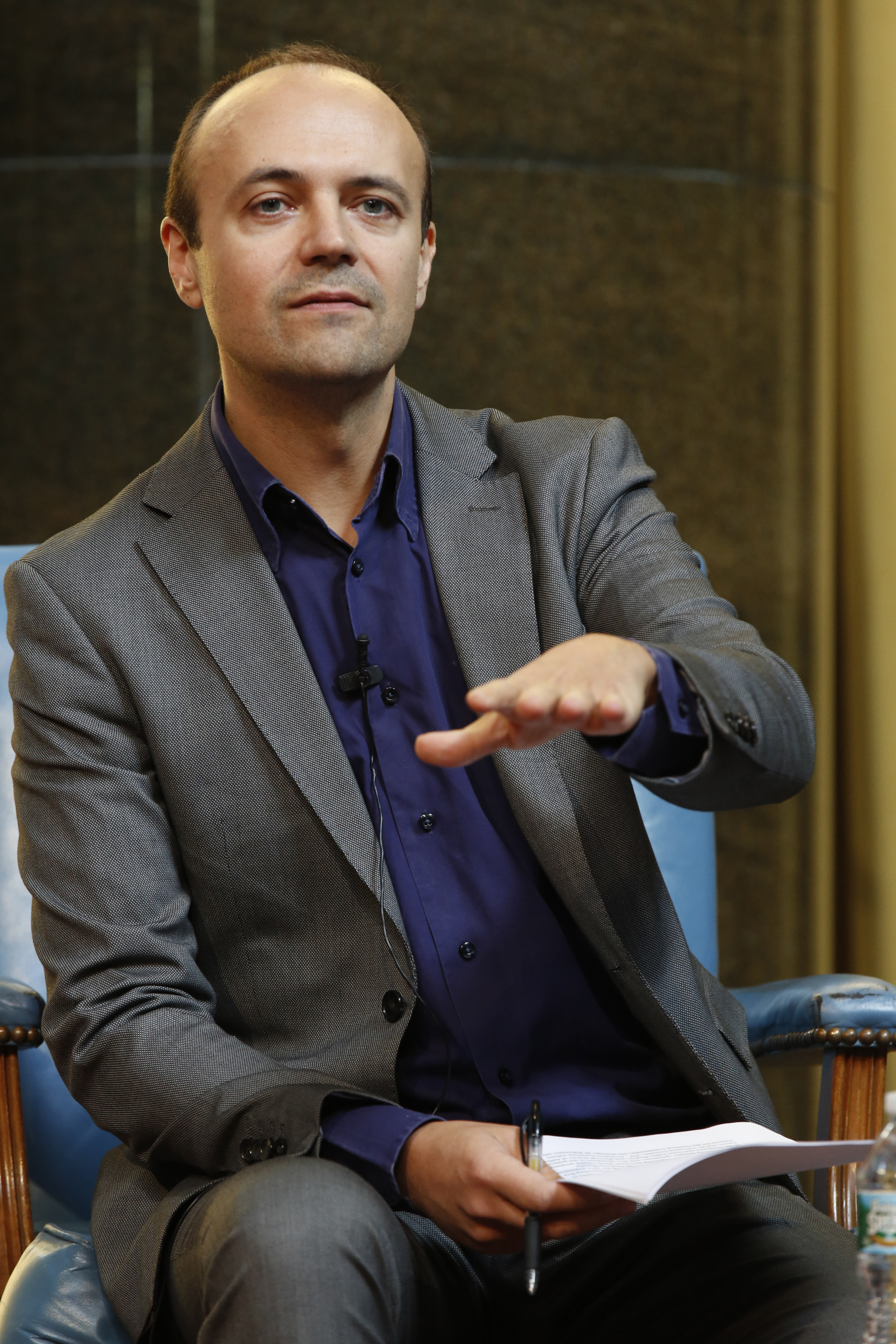
- Otero-Pailos speaking at Columbia University, 2015
- Born: 27 October 1971 (age 54); Madrid, Spain
- Education: Cornell University (B. Arch, 1994, M. AUD 1995), MIT (Ph.D. 2002)
- Occupation: Architect
- Awards: Academia Científica y De Cultura Iberoamericana, Académico [Academy of Science and Culture of Ibero-America, Academician], 2016 American Institute of Architects, Merit Award, New Holland Island Masterplan, a collaboration with Work AC 2013. UNESCO, Eminent Professional Award, 2012 Academy of Arts and Sciences of Puerto Rico, Academico Correspondiente [Foreign Academician], 2011 Lawrence B. Anderson Award, MIT, 2004
- Practice: Preservation, Public Art Installation, Sculptures, Painting, Photography, Drawings
- Buildings: Former US Embassy in Oslo; Master Plan for New Holland Island, St Petersburg, Russia
- Projects: The Ethics of Dust series (2008-present); Distributed Monuments (2017-present); Répétiteur (2018); Space-Time 1964/2014 (2014); Olfactory Reconstruction, Philip Johnson Glass House (2008)

Jorge Otero-Pailos (born 27 October 1971) is an artist, preservation architect, theorist and educator, recognized for his contributions to experimental preservation and as the founder and editor of the journal Future Anterior, the first scholarly journal dedicated to preservation theory. He is best known for his “The Ethics of Dust” ongoing series of artworks created by casting pollution and surface residues from monuments, which was exhibited at the 53rd Venice Biennale. Westminster Hall, the Victoria & Albert Museum, and SFMoMA, amongst others. His work often intersects art and preservation, as seen in his advocacy for the restoration of modernist embassies, where he integrates artistic practices into architectural conservation. He is Director and Professor of Historic Preservation at Columbia University Graduate School of Architecture, Planning and Preservation (Columbia GSAPP).

== Early life and education ==
Jorge Otero-Pailos was born in Madrid, the only son of Justo Otero, a landscape painter and forestry engineer, and María Jesús Pailos, a computer scientist. His early childhood was marked by international travel to historic sites, facilitated by Spain's transition from dictatorship to democracy, which made it easier for Spaniards to go abroad. He attended the Lycée Français de Madrid. His father taught him painting. In 1985, Otero-Pailos traveled to the United States through a study abroad program, and was a foreign exchange student at Barrington High School, a suburb of Chicago, Illinois, where his art teacher introduced him to Frank Lloyd Wright, and encouraged him to study architecture.

Otero-Pailos received a Bachelors of Architecture (1994) and a Masters of Urban Design (1995) from Cornell University College of Architecture, Art, and Planning, where he was awarded the Richmond Harold Shreve Award for best graduate thesis. He studied design with the Texas Rangers (architects) Colin Rowe, John Shaw, and Lee Hodgden, and studied theory with art historian Hal Foster, who introduced him to psychoanalytic theory, and became a pupil of philosopher Susan Buck-Morss, who trained him in Critical Theory. In 1991, he founded the student journal Submission, to advance theoretical discourse within the school. Together with fellow students Alfonso D’Onofrio and Jess Mullen-Carey, he conceived and directed the public television series V.E.T.V. (Visual Evangelist Tele Vision), which explored the relationship between architecture, broadcasting and digital media. V.E.T.V. featured surrealist scenes acted by fellow students and narrated by Otero-Pailos, spliced between interviews with Mark Jarzombek, Rem Koolhaas, Mark Wigley, Susan Buck-Morss, and others.

== Academic career ==
In 1995, Otero-Pailos moved to San Juan to join Jorge Rigau in the effort to found the New School of Architecture at the Polytechnic University of Puerto Rico, serving as the school's first full-time professor. He received the Angel Ramos Foundation Research Grant to continue his investigation of the relationship between architecture and media, this time focused on the portrayal of Puerto Rican social violence and architecture in the news. He exhibited his paintings, collages and sculptures made of recycled materials in Puerto Rican galleries, and wrote opinion pieces about architecture and urbanism in the press.

In 1997, Otero-Pailos conducted doctoral studies at the MIT School of Architecture and Planning under Prof. Mark Jarzombek, and wrote a dissertation on the history of architectural phenomenology, which was later published as the book “Architecture’s Historical Turn: Phenomenology and the Rise of the Postmodern”

In 2002, Otero-Pailos was appointed Assistant Professor of Historic Preservation at Columbia University Graduate School of Architecture, Planning and Preservation.

In 2004 he founded the journal Future Anterior, the first scholarly journal in the US to focus on the history theory and criticism of historic preservation, published by the University of Minnesota Press.

He has contributed to numerous scholarly journals and books including the Oxford Encyclopedia of Aesthetics, and Rem Koolhaas’ Preservation Is Overtaking Us (2014).

In 2016, he was appointed as the Director of Historic Preservation at Columbia University GSAPP, and director of the Columbia Preservation Technology Laboratory, which serves as a hub for teaching and advanced research on the preservation of existing buildings through evolving technologies.

In 2018, he founded the Columbia GSAPP PhD program in historic preservation, the first such program in the United States. Otero-Pailos collaborated with Dean Amale Andraos and Dean Emeritus Mark Wigley to create the program.

In 2023, he authored Historic Preservation Theory: Readings from the 18th to the 21st Century the first English-language anthology of historic preservation theory with an international perspective.

== Collaborations with architects ==
=== Restoration of the former U.S. Embassy, Oslo, Norway ===
Jorge Otero-Pailos has been a leading advocate for the preservation of U.S. modernist embassies, emphasizing their architectural and cultural significance. Notably, he collaborated with Oslo-based preservation architect Erik Langdalen on the restoration of the former U.S. Embassy in Oslo, originally designed by Eero Saarinen in 1959. Their work involved developing a comprehensive preservation plan, restoring the original concrete facade, and guiding the project through the landmark commission review process. This project received several accolades, including the City of Oslo’s Architecture Prize (Oslo bys arkitekturpris), the Design Award of Excellence from Docomomo US, and the OMA Awards for Transformation Project of the Year.

=== Masterplan for New Holland Island, St. Petersburg, Russia ===
In 2013, Otero-Pailos was selected as Preservation Architect to work on New Holland Island, an 8-hectare site located the historic center of St. Petersburg, Russia. Otero-Pailos collaborated with Work Architecture Company, Master Planner and Design Architect. The client team was Dasha Zukhova and Roman Abramovitz. Otero-Pailos won the American Institute of Architects Merit Award (2013) for his contribution to this project.

== Artistic career ==
=== Influences ===
In an interview with M.I.T. Art Initiative, Otero-Pailos cites his father as a key figure in his artistic development. Otero-Pailos explains how his father would bring him along as "he would set up easels at the Prado Museum, copying paintings by Goya" and how "Trips to the Parthenon in Greece and Teotihuacan in Mexico cultivated a lifelong interest in architecture and its connection to art." Otero-Pailos credits Krzysztof Wodiczko, a Polish artist who works on architectural facades and monuments for making him realize that “Art can make monuments speak in a contemporary language.” Otero-Pailos further credits Leila W. Kinney, the Executive Director of Arts Initiatives and the Center for Art, Science & Technology, at M.I.T, for introducing him to sculptor Eva Hesse, whose work with latex became a major influence for Otero-Pailos.

=== The Ethics of Dust (2008 to present) ===
The Ethics of Dust is a series of artworks where Otero-Pailos transfers the pollution on monuments onto latex casts. The title of the series indicates a dialogue with John Ruskin, one of the founders of preservation. Each work in the series is distinguished by the subtitle, which takes the name of the monument.

Works in the series thus far include:

- The Ethics of Dust: Ex-Alumix (2008)
- The Ethics of Dust: Doge's Palace (2009)
- The Ethics of Dust: Carthago Nova (2013)
- The Ethics of Dust: Trajan's Column (2015)
- The Ethics of Dust: Maison de Famille Louis Vuitton (2015)
- The Ethics of Dust: Old United States Mint (2015)
- The Ethics of Dust: Westminster Hall (2016)

=== Distributed Monuments (2017 to present) ===
Distributed Monuments is a body of work made of dust transferred onto latex casts and enclosed in light boxes. Each cast is extracted from distinct site-specific interventions performed by Otero-Pailos as part of his series of works called The Ethics of Dust. The artworks’ materials come from monuments such as Westminster Hall in London, the Doge's Palace in Venice, or the U.S. Old Mint in San Francisco. Designed to be easily transported, Otero-Pailos explains in an interview for ArtSpace that the work "questions our relationship with building as cultural objects and inspire us to care for the object as such, to become cultural stewards." The Distributed Monuments series was first exhibited at the Seaman's House, a 2017 exhibition in the Chelsea district of New York City curated by Helen Allen Smith, and second at the Chicago Architecture Biennial 2017 titled Make New History curated by Artistic Directors Sharon Johnston and Mark Lee of the Los Angeles–based firm Johnston Marklee. Otero-Pailos' contribution to the Chicago Architecture Biennial received positive critical reviews.

=== Analogue Sites (2024) ===
"Analogue Sites" was a public art exhibition by Jorge Otero-Pailos displayed on Manhattan's Park Avenue from April 1 to October 31, 2024. The exhibition consisted of three large-scale steel sculptures crafted from sections of the fence that originally surrounded the former U.S. Embassy in Oslo, a landmark designed by architect Eero Saarinen. These works engaged with the modernist architectural landscape of Park Avenue, including landmarks such as the Seagram Building examining themes of cultural diplomacy and architectural preservation. The exhibition was produced by Otero-Pailos Studio at the invitation of The Fund for Park Avenue Sculpture Committee. The exhibition led to numerous public programs with cultural partners and a digital guide created in partnership with Bloomberg Connects, part of Bloomberg Philanthropy.

=== Treaties on De-Fences (2024) ===
"Treaties on De-Fences" was an exhibition by Jorge Otero-Pailos held at the National Museum of American Diplomacy (NMAD) in Washington, D.C., beginning June 4, 2024. The exhibition focused on the decommissioned U.S. Embassy in Oslo and featured sculptures made from its original steel fence as well as an artist's book of prints. The exhibition was curated by Todd Kinser and produced in partnership with the Foundation for Art and Preservation in Embassies.

=== American Academy in Rome (2021-22) ===
In 2021 and 2022, Jorge Otero-Pailos completed the Roy Lichtenstein Visual Art Residency at the American Academy in Rome. During his residency, he created a series of cast works that explored the material traces of time and decay through the lens of experimental preservation. His work was included in the group exhibition Regeneration, curated by Lindsay Harris, interim Andrew Heiskell Arts Director, and Elizabeth Rodini, interim Director. The exhibition opened on April 13, 2022, at the American Academy in Rome and featured works by artists across five continents. Regeneration examined themes of decay and renewal in historical and cultural contexts, with Otero-Pailos’s contributions tying processes of change, such as dust and rust accumulation, to the city of Rome itself. His work was exhibited alongside notable pieces by artists such as Guillermo Kuitca, Sonya Clark, and Yeesookyung.

=== Watershed Moment (2020-2021) ===
"Watershed Moment" was a site-specific art installation by Jorge Otero-Pailos, commissioned to mark the opening of Lyndhurst Mansion's unrestored swimming pool building after extensive stabilization. The installation featured monumental cast-latex curtains suspended over the empty pool, accompanied by a soundscape of water recordings from various New York State locations. This immersive experience invited visitors to reflect on the interplay between water, architecture, and memory.

=== Répétiteur (2018) ===
Otero-Pailos was invited by New York City Center to create a site-specific art installation as part of the Center's inaugural program of visual art commissions and the Merce Cunningham Centennial. Otero-Pailos was one of three artists invited, alongside photographer Nina Robinson, and conceptual artist Lawrence Weiner. Otero-Pailos created a series of artworks titled Répétiteur, a work reflecting on the history of dance and the labor involved with passing on the knowledge of a dance to a new generation of dancers. The installation derives its name from the term “répétiteur,” a person entrusted with teaching, coaching, and rehearsing a choreographer's work. It is the first time that Otero-Pailos not only uses his signature language of dust and liquid latex, but also introduces sound collages, and flips the verticality of the wall onto the horizontality of the floor. The exhibition received positive critical reviews from the press including an art review in the New York Times in April 2019

=== Space-Time 1964-2014 ===
Space-Time is a reconstruction of Harold Edgerton's iconic 1964 photograph “Bullet Through Apple,” done in collaboration with the MIT Museum, the Edgerton Center, and the MIT Department of Architecture. Otero-Pailos used Edgerton's own instruments to take the photo again, 50 years later. While conducting the reconstruction, examining the direction of the bullet's rotation, Otero-Pailos discovered that Edgerton had flipped the negative while printing his photograph, and that the iconic image is in fact backwards. Otero-Pailos decided to “correct” this. In his photograph, the bullet travels left to right, rather than right to left as in the original.

=== Continuous Cities ===
Continuous Cities is a series of work consisting of city maps that the artist has collected since the '90s and on which he has painted patterns. In discussing the work in an interview with ArtSpace, Otero-Pailos says that he considers "Cities as the major long-lasting monuments that we are collectively constructing together as a civilization."
