= Malo Huston =

Malo Hutson is the Dean of the School of Architecture at the University of Virginia. Prior to serving as dean, Hutson was an associate professor in urban planning at Columbia Graduate School of Architecture, Planning and Preservation with a focus on equity through urban policy, health and the built environment.

== Education and career ==
Hutson received his PhD from the Department of Urban Studies & Planning at Massachusetts Institute of Technology in 2006 and Bachelor of Arts in sociology and Master of City Planning degrees from the University of California, Berkeley in 1997 and 1999 respectively. Before he joined Columbia, Hutson was an associate professor at the University of California, Berkeley and the associate director of the Institute of Urban & Regional Planning and Chair of the Urban Studies Program. Hutson was also a fellow at University of Michigan's Center for Social Epidemiology and Population Health as an alum of the Robert Wood Johnson Health and Society Scholars Program.

== Projects and writings ==
Hutson has participated in many national initiatives, such as the Obama Administration's White House Forum on Environmental Justice, and the PEW Charitable Trusts and Robert Wood Johnson Foundation Health Impact Project.

In his book The Urban Struggle for Economics, Environmental, and Social Justice: Deepening Their Roots (Routledge, 2016), he writes of the relationship of local residents with their community leaders to challenge the gentrification of the neighborhood.
