= Low-tech Magazine =

Blog

LOW←TECH MAGAZINE
- Website type: Blog
- Available in: English; French; German; Spanish; Dutch; Polish; Italian; Portuguese
- Founded: 2007
- Headquarters: Barcelona
- Country of origin: Spain
- Creator: Kris De Decker
- Key people: Marie Verdeil: prototype design, graphic design, workshops, visual media, illustrations, management Roel Roscam Abbing: solar powered server, solar web design
- Website: https://solar.lowtechmagazine.com/
- Current status: Live

Low-Tech Magazine is a blog about low-technology founded in 2007 and operated by Kris De Decker. De Decker had previously worked as a technology reporter. The website "underscores the potential of past and often forgotten technologies, and how they can inform sustainable energy practices".

In 2018, De Decker launched a low-tech, solar powered website, hosted from Barcelona. This version reduced the size of the website by a factor of five. The site sometimes goes offline in cloudy weather as it relies on solar panels and batteries fitted in De Deckers' balcony.

The articles in the website have been translated to eleven languages. It has been in print since 2019. Printed books include a compressed edition, thematic books, a chronological series and translated books in Dutch and French.
