= Future Anterior =

- Discipline: Historic preservation, theory, and criticism
- Language: English
- Edited by: Jorge Otero-Pailos

Publication details
- History: 2004-present
- Publisher: University of Minnesota Press (United States)
- Frequency: Biannual

Standard abbreviations
- ISO 4: Future Anterior

Indexing
- ISSN: 1549-9715 (print); 1934-6026 (web)
- LCCN: 2004215062
- JSTOR: 15499715
- OCLC no.: 525286653

Links
- Journal homepage; Online archive at Project MUSE

Future Anterior is a biannual peer-reviewed academic journal published by the University of Minnesota Press. The editor-in-chief is Jorge Otero-Pailos (Columbia Graduate School of Architecture, Planning and Preservation).

== History ==
The journal was established in 2004 by Jorge Otero-Pailos and is dedicated to the "critical examination of historic preservation." The journal's title is a reference to the grammatical tense, futur antérieur, and is an allusion to the field of historic preservation as "concerned both with what has not yet happened (future) and what has already happened (anterior)."

== Scope ==
In addition to its primary focus on historic preservation history, theory, and criticism, it also includes essays on various topics including "art, philosophy, law, geography, archeology, planning, materials science, cultural anthropology, and conservation." Each issue contains articles, an exhibition review, a feature piece, a book review, and an artist intervention.

== Impact ==
At its establishment, Otero-Pailos said that the journal "signals the maturation of the field of preservation and a shift…towards an active involvement in the understanding and creative transformation of human environments." Future Anterior also provides a forum for discussion of the field of preservation and architecture and influenced the 2006-2007 student architect competition, Preservation as Provocation: Re-designing Saarinen's Cranbrook Academy of Art in Michigan, that "called on students to address a complex set of criteria that roughly broke down as engagement, program, time, and technology, prompted by the theory of historic provocation suggested by Otero-Pailos's writings in the journal that he edits, Future Anterior."

The journal is abstracted and indexed in the Arts & Humanities Citation Index, Current Contents/Arts & Humanities, and Scopus.
