= Mary McLeod =

Mary McLeod may refer to:

- Mary Adelia McLeod (1938-2022), American Episcopalian clergy, first woman Diocesan Bishop in the Episcopal Church
- Mary E. McLeod (active since 1984), Canadian costume designer
- Mary McLeod (academic), American architecture educator
- Mary McLeod Bethune (1875–1955), American educator

== See also ==
- Mary MacLeod (disambiguation)
- Mary Macleod (born 1969), British Conservative Party politician
- Mary Anne MacLeod Trump (1912–2000), American mother of Donald Trump
