= Karla Rothstein =

American architect

Karla Maria Rothstein
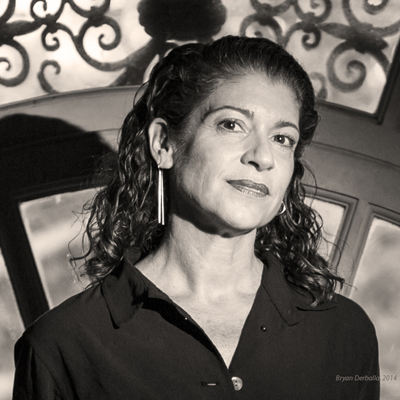
- Born: April 6, 1966 (age 60)
- Education: University of Maryland (B. Arch, 1988); Columbia Graduate School of Architecture, Planning and Preservation (M.Arch., 1992)
- Occupation: Architect
- Practice: Latent Productions
- Projects: Ballston Lake House; Greylock Mill, North Adams MA; SEED, Twenty Five Affordable Homes; Beach 43, The Rockaways, Queens NY; House of Little People. NY, NY; 20th Street Condos. Brooklyn, NY; Verboten, Brooklyn, NY

Karla Maria S. Rothstein (born 1966) is an American architect and adjunct Associate Professor at Columbia Graduate School of Architecture, Planning and Preservation, where she is also the founder and director of Columbia University's trans-disciplinary DeathLAB Rothstein is also the co-founder of Latent Productions, an architecture, research, and development firm in New York City, which she co-founded in 1999 with Salvatore Perry. A significant focus of her architecture practice, research, and teaching has been redefining urban spaces of death and remembrance.

== Early years ==
Karla Rothstein received a Bachelor of Architecture from the University of Maryland, School of Architecture in 1988 and a Master of Architecture from Columbia University's Graduate School of Architecture, Planning and Preservation (GSAPP) in 1992. While at GSAPP, Karla participated in exchange programs in Russia and Switzerland, receiving Certificates of Academic Exchange from the Moscow Institute of Architecture in 1989 and the Eidgenössische Technische Hochschule (ETH) in 1991. Prior to co-founding her own architecture practice, Rothstein worked as an international coordinating architect for William McDonough and Ralph Appelbaum & Associates.

== Work ==
Rothstein's first built work was "Ballston Lake House" near Saratoga Springs, New York, developed with Joel Towers, which is anchored by 150,000 pounds of precast concrete. It was the only US house included in the book "In DETAIL: Single Family Houses" (Birkhäuser, 2000) in addition to being counted among notable architecture historian Kenneth Frampton's anthology of American Masterworks (Rizzoli, 2008).

In 2014, Karla Rothstein's design of a commercial space that featured custom fabricated concrete blocks cast in flour sacks was recognized by Built by Women New York City and the American Institute of Architects New York. In 2015, Latent's Constellation Park project placed third in an international competition on new ways of memorializing the dead. A model of the project was sold by Christie's at a charity auction and is currently on display at Sir John Soane's Museum in London. Constellation Park was featured in New York Magazine's 2016 Reasons to Love New York issue. Her most notable work was Verboten, a 10,000 square foot night club in Brooklyn, New York. Current projects include the design and development of 25 units of affordable housing in Brownsville, Brooklyn, awarded through the New York City Department of Housing Preservation and Development, the design of environmentally-advanced civic infrastructure to replace urban cemeteries, an environmentally-conscious childcare facility in New York City, a prototype for a resilient small scale building in a Rockaways flood zone, and the conversion of a 240,000 square foot former mill in the Berkshires called Greylock Works, among others. Greylock Works is little more than two years into a renovation process that will transform the former industrial site converted into a mixture of food production, residential, hotel and restaurant space. The project was recently awarded a substantial grant of $1.72 million from the Massachusetts State Secretary of Housing and Economic Development.

Supported as a Jacob Javits Fellow in Fine Arts from 1988–1992, a William Kinne Traveling Fellow in 1992, and a NYFA recipient in 2000, Rothstein's professional and academic work has been featured and/or exhibited at Storefront for Art and Architecture, Rensselaer Polytechnic Institute, Barnard College, Columbia University, Van Alen Institute, Max Protetch Gallery, the Center for Architecture, Gizmodo, Architecture Magazine, Casabella, The New York Times, Financial Times, The Wall Street Journal, and WIRED, Japan.

In July 2018, an extensive exhibition entitled DeathLAB: Democratizing Death opened at the 21st Century Museum of Contemporary Art in Kanazawa, Japan and will run until March 2019. The exhibition includes video loops of DeathLAB's Manifesto/Imperative, several design projects, and a series of edited and curated interviews conducted over the past two years.

== Selected awards and honors ==
2001

- Progressive Architecture Award Citation for 20+22 Renwick, a proposal for an 11-story building challenging NYC zoning interpretation

2006

- New York/ New Foundations Affordable Housing, New York City Department of Housing Preservation and Development

2013

- Presidential Award to Honor Great Teaching, Finalist, Columbia University
- DesignBoom Design for Death Architecture Competition, Short-listed design for Constellation Park

2014:

- AIANY Honor Award, Interiors, for Runner&Stone, a bakery-barrestaurant in Gowanus, NY
- Architizer's A+ Awards, Architecture + Materials, Finalist for concrete Belly Blocks
- Monumental Masonry Competition, International funerary design, third place for Constellation Park

2015

- BxW, Built by Women NYC, award recognizing 100 women contributing to outstanding structures and built environments in New York City

2016

- DeathLAB + LATENT Productions' design proposal "Sylvan Constellation" has been awarded first place in the Future Cemetery 2016 design competition. The proposal reimagines the future of Arnos Vale Cemetery in Bristol, UK, with 150 anaerobic funerary vessels rising from the ground into a woodland canopy.

2018

- Fall-Winter MacDowell Fellowship

== Selected publications and lectures ==
2003:

- "process is the pollywog", Columbia University Graduate School of Architecture, Planning and Preservation ISBN 1-883584-28-0

2013:

- "'Reconfiguring Urban Spaces of Disposal, Sanctuary and Remembrance" included as a chapter in ABC-CLIO Praeger's "Our Changing Journey to the End: Reshaping Death, Dying, and Grief in America." ISBN 978-1-4408-2845-4
- "Carbon Black" in "V is for Vermillion as described by Vitruvius, An A to Z of Ink in Architecture ." ISBN 978-1-883584-90-0

2014:

- "Civic-Sanctuary" in "Zawia."

2016:

- "DEATHLAB Designing the Civic-Sacred" in "PASAJES Architectura"

2018:

- "The New Civic–Sacred: Designing for Life and Death in the Modern Metropolis" in "MIT Design Issues""
- "Death and the City: Designing the Civic-Sacred" in "Death and Architecture"
- "Salon 19 Modern Death" in "MoMA R&D"

== Selected exhibitions ==
2018

- DeathLAB: Democratizing Death at the 21st Century Museum of Contemporary Art, July 2018-March 2019
- OnSite: Karla Rothstein at Art Omi, October 6-November 4, 2018
