= Laura Kurgan =

South African architect

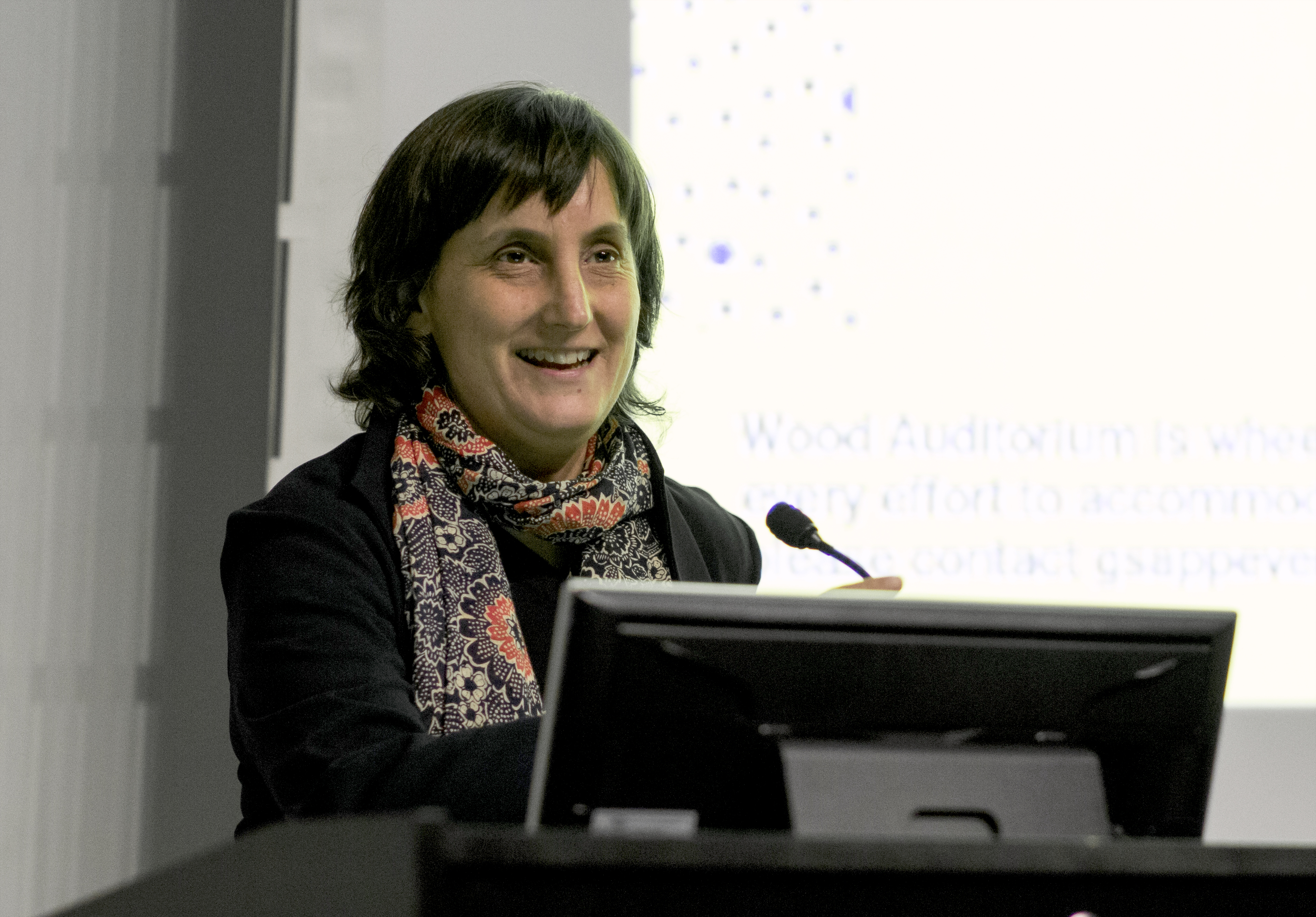
- Laura Kurgan speaking at Columbia University, September 2015
- Born: Capetown, South Africa
- Occupations: Architect and Professor
- Known for: Director, Center for Spatial Research, Columbia University

Laura Kurgan is a South African architect and an associate professor at Columbia University Graduate School of Architecture, Planning and Preservation (GSAPP). She directs the interdisciplinary Center for Spatial Research at GSAPP, which she founded as the Spatial Information Design Lab in 2004. Since 1995, the architect has operated her own New York City based interdisciplinary design firm called Laura Kurgan Design. She has been awarded the Rockefeller Fellowship and a Graham Foundation Grant. Kurgan's work has been presented at prestigious institutions including the ZKM Karlsruhe, the Museum of Modern Art, the New Museum and the Venice Architecture Biennial.

== Projects ==
=== Close Up at a Distance: Mapping, Technology and Politics ===
In 2013 the MIT Press published her book Close Up at a Distance: Mapping, Technology and Politics. The book explores the impact of modern spatial visualization technology including GPS, democratized dissemination of data through the internet, and Google Earth on mapping physical and virtual interactions. In Jennifer S. Light's review of the book, she states the strongest aspect of the early chapters in the book is that it "introduces design professionals to a new form of media literacy." The work was presented in conversation with Neil Brenner at Princeton University's School of Architecture in October 2013.

=== Million Dollar Blocks ===
Created in conjunction with the Spatial Information Design Lab at Columbia University and the Justice Mapping Center, Million Dollar Blocks was a term coined by Laura Kurgan and Eric Cadora to describe the amount of money that taxpayers may spend on incarcerating the people on an individual city block. The project used information from the criminal justice system to create maps which visualized the disproportionately large number of people jailed from a couple of specific neighborhoods in five American cities. In her essay in The Atlantic about the project, Kurgan wrote "Nationwide, an estimated two-thirds of the people who leave prison are rearrested within three years. The perpetual migration between prison and a few predictable neighborhoods is not only costly—it also destabilizes community life." In 2008, an image from the project, labeled "Architecture and Justice 1", was exhibited at the Museum of Modern Art in New York City for the show Design and the Elastic Mind. The work has since been collected by the Museum of Modern Art. In the catalog essay for that 2008 exhibition, Recently the Brooklyn maps from the project were presented again at the Museum of Modern Art for its exhibition Scenes for a New Heritage: Contemporary Art from the Collection. In the catalog for the exhibition Design and the Elastic Mind, edited by curator Paola Antonelli, the urban theorist Peter Hall stated that the project, "does offer a new kind of benchmark for critical visualization."

=== Jumping the Great Firewall ===
Done in collaboration with a team from the Spatial Information Design Lab, Pen American Center and the Brown Institute for Media Innovation, this project investigated free expression online in China. As principal investigator, Kurgan led her team of researchers in examining and visualizing the strategies that Chinese internet users employ to access and participate in aspects of the web that are typically blocked in that country.
