= Mary MacLeod =

Mary MacLeod or Macleod may refer to:

- Mary Anne MacLeod Trump (1912–2000), Scottish-born American mother of Donald Trump, and wife of Fred Trump
- Mary Isabella Macleod (1852–1933), Canadian pioneer, and husband of James Macleod
- Mary MacLeod (actress) (1937–2016), Scottish actress
- Mary Macleod (born 1969), British Conservative Party politician, Member of Parliament for Brentford and Isleworth 2010 – 2015
- Màiri nighean Alasdair Ruaidh (c.1615 – c.1707), also known as Mary Macleod

== See also ==
- Mary McLeod (disambiguation)
