= Low technology =

Simple technology

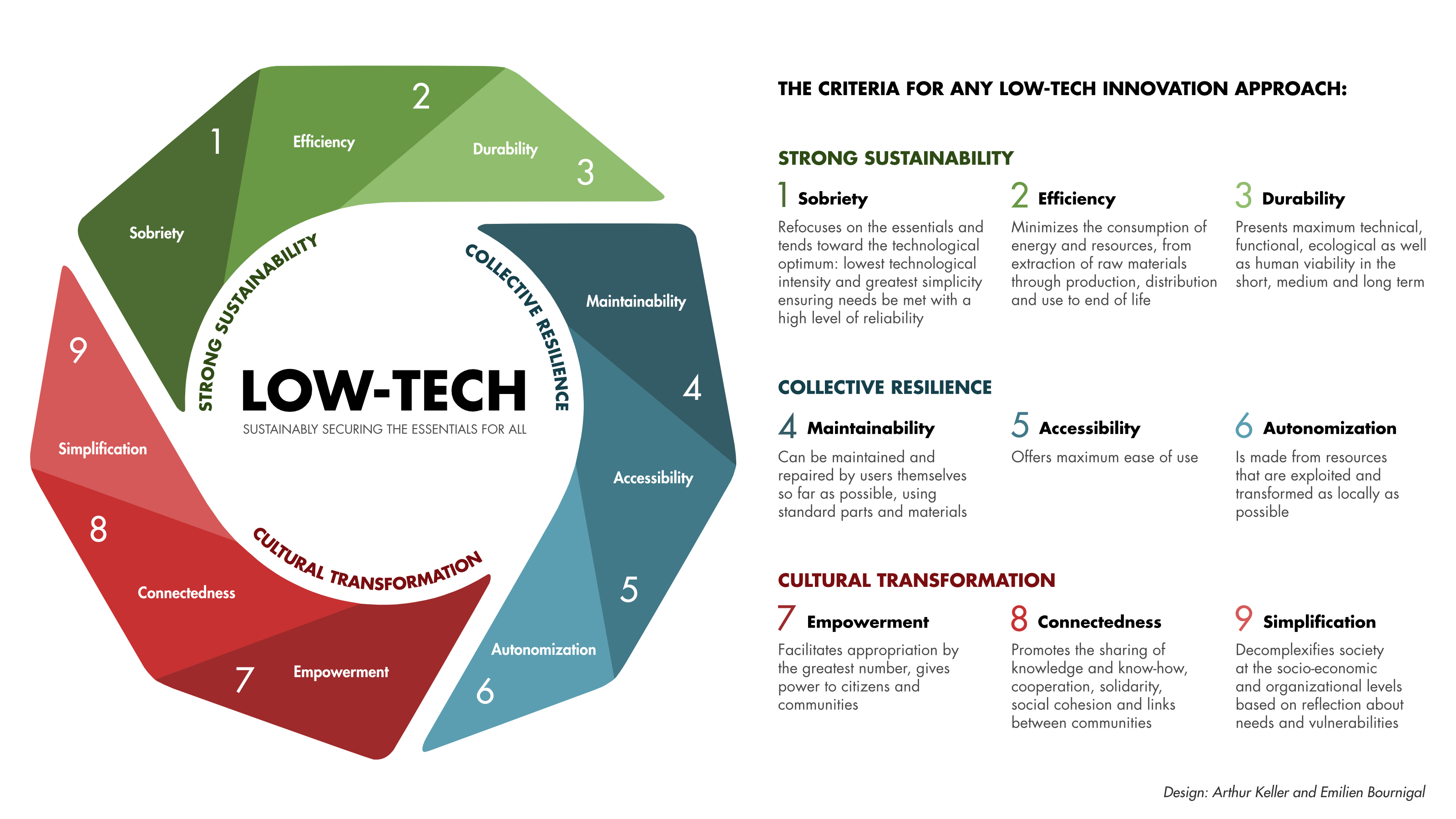
Infographic "Low-techs: Sustainably securing the essentials for all" gathering the criteria for any low-tech innovation approach

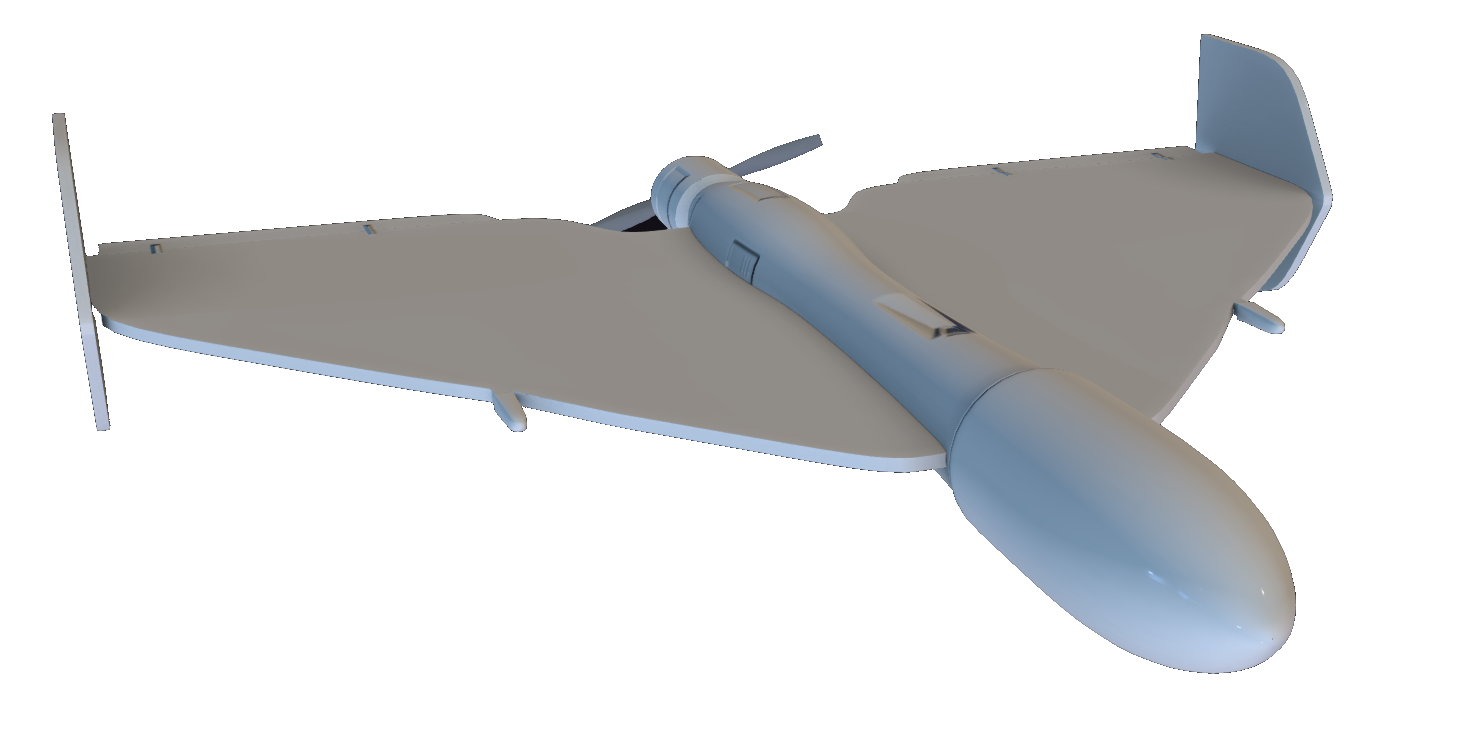
The Shahed-136 is an Iranian low-tech drone.

Low technology (low tech; adjective forms: low-technology, low-tech, lo-tech) is simple technology, as opposed to high technology. In addition, low tech is related to the concept of mid-tech, that is a balance between low-tech and high-tech, which combines the efficiency and versatility of high tech with low tech's potential for autonomy and resilience.

== History ==
=== Historical origin ===
Primitive technologies such as bushcraft, tools that use wood, stone, wool, etc. can be seen as low-tech, as can pre–Industrial Revolution machines such as windmills or sailboats.

=== In the 1970s ===
The economic boom after the Vietnam War resulted in a doubt on progress, technology and growth at the beginning of the 70s, notably with through the report The Limits to Growth (1972). Many have sought to define what soft technologies are, leading to a "low-tech movement". Such technologies have been described as "intermediaries" (E. F. Schumacher), "liberating" (M. Bookchin), or even democratic. Thus, a philosophy of advocating a widespread use of soft technologies was developed in the United States, and many studies were carried out in those years, in particular by researchers like Langdon Winner.

=== 2000s and later ===
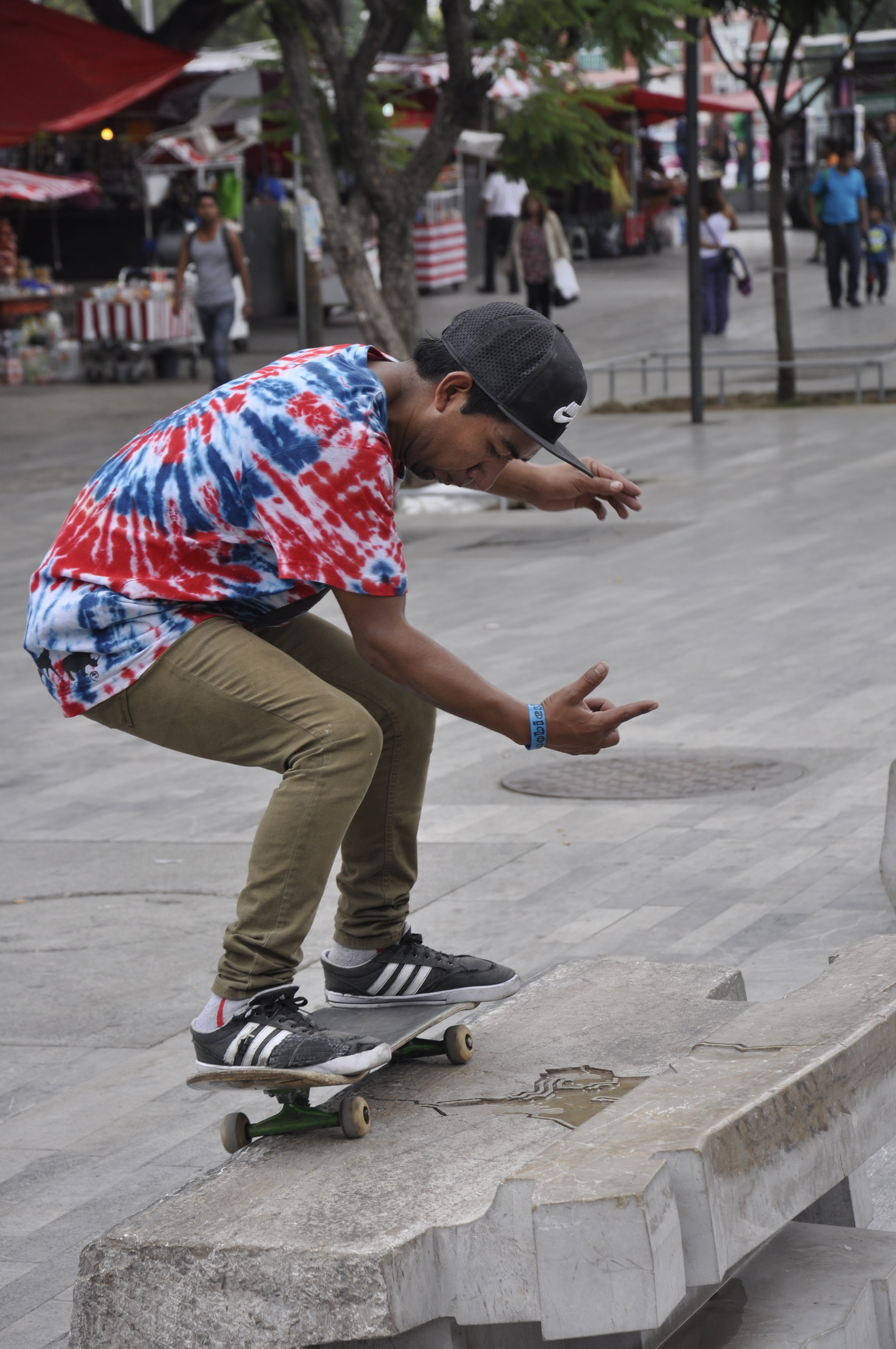
Skateboarding in Mexico City

"Low-tech" has been more and more employed in the scientific writings, in particular in the analyzes of the work from some authors of the 1970s: see for example Hirsch ‐ Kreinsen, the book "High tech, low tech, no tech" or Gordon.

More recently, the perspective of resource scarcity – especially minerals – led to an increasingly severe criticism on high-techs and technology.

In 2014, the French engineer Philippe Bihouix published "L'âge des low tech" (The age of low-techs) where he presents how a European nation like France, with little mineral and energy resources, could become a "low-tech" nation (instead of a "start-up" nation) to better correspond to the sustainable development goals of such nation.

=== Recently ===
Numerous new definitions have come to supplement or qualify the term "low-tech", intended to be more precise because they are restricted to a particular characteristic:

- retro-tech: more oriented toward old but smart inventions (not necessarily useful, durable and accessible), parallels can nevertheless be found with low-tech, because these innovations often are decentralized and simpler technologies (because manufactured by individuals) ".
- Wild-tech: beyond the high-tech / low-tech opposition, it intends to give "tools to better think these ways of manufacturing which escape any classification". The unclassifiable techs. Can also be linked to "tech rebel", a movement whose goal is to hack and to re-appropriate any type of technology.
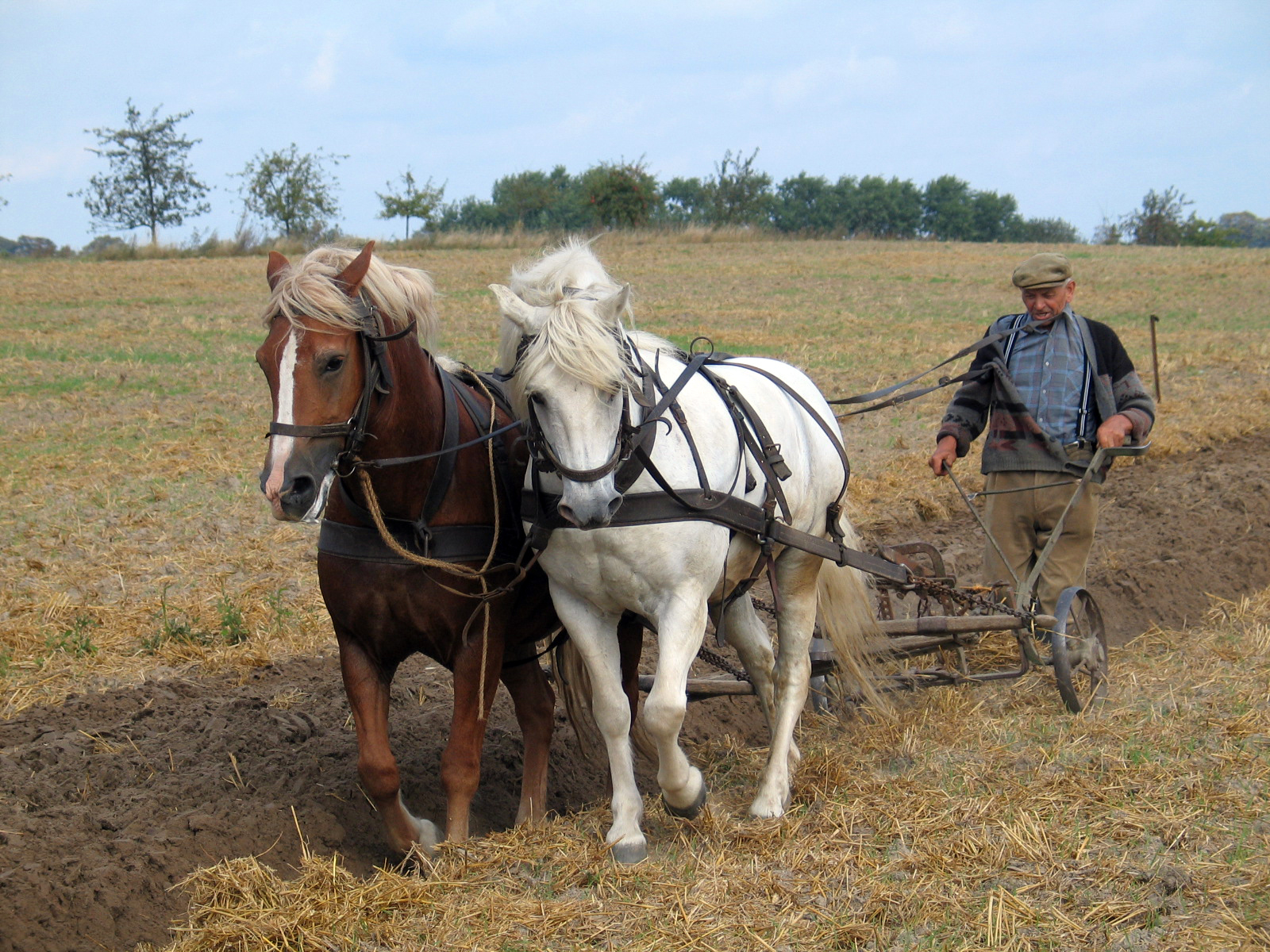
  Traditional ploughing: a farmer works the land with horses and plough.
- small-tech: opposed to "Big Tech", which includes the GAFAM. It thus referred to digital questions, "in the perspective of maintaining a high level of technological complexity but on the basis of the notions of commons, collaborative work and the principles of democracy and social justice"
- (s)lowtech, or slow-tech: uses the play-on-words (s)low / slow. Aims at: "exploring the drawbacks of technology and its effects on human health and development". Also indicates a movement aimed at reducing addiction to technology, especially among the youth. However, its highest similarity with the definition of low-techs is that it is restricted to technologies (of all kinds) that promote a slow lifestyle.
- easy-tech: technology easy to implement, to use, and accessible to all. At the heart of the commonly accepted definition of low-tech.
- no-tech: promotes a lifestyle avoiding the use of technology, when possible. It joins some technocritical writings on the negative and time-consuming aspect of most "modern" technologies.
- Lo-Tek (or LoTek): name introduced by Julia Watson for her book "The Power of Lo — TEK – A global exploration of nature-based technology".

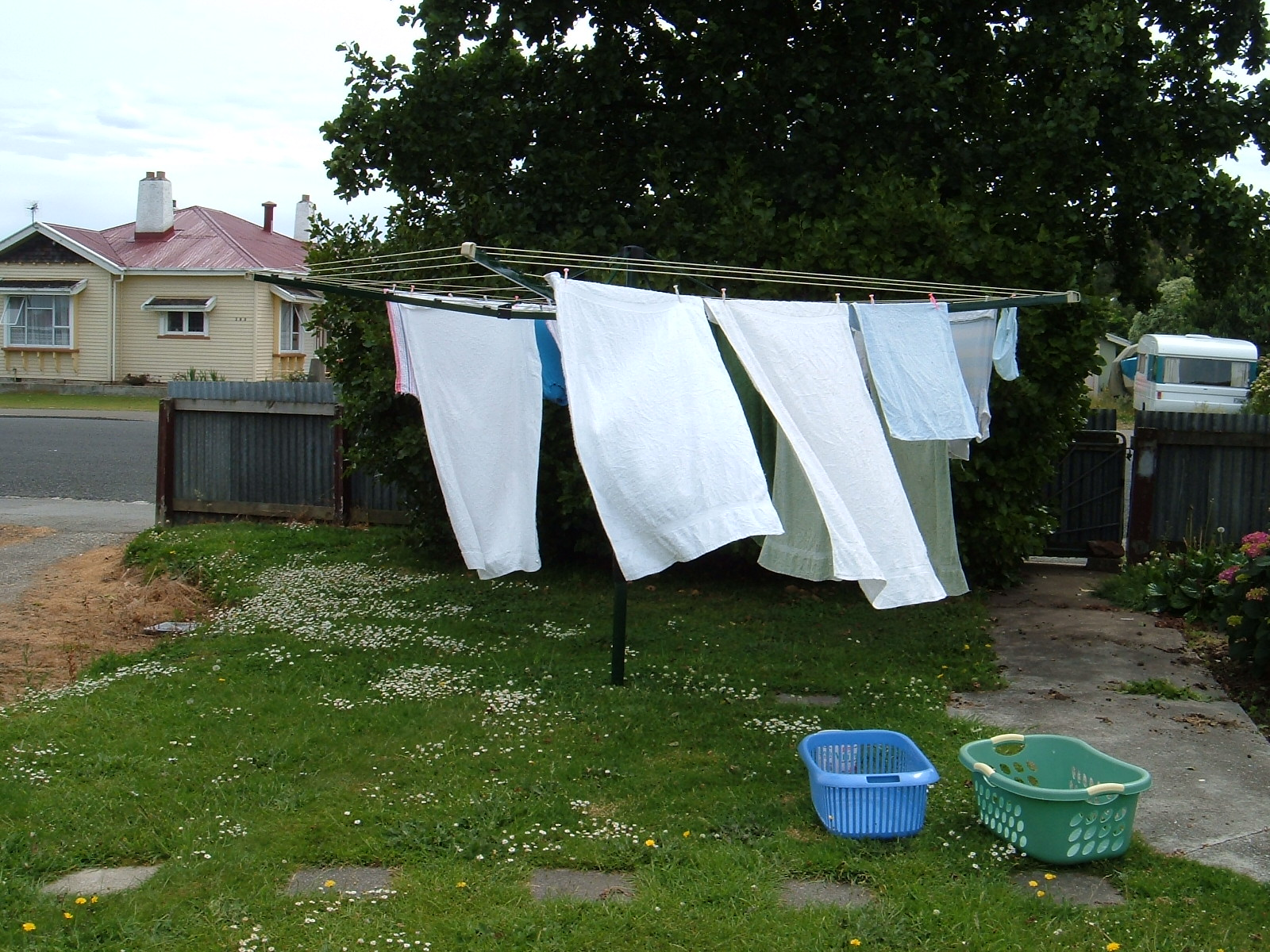
Rotary clothesline

== Definitions ==
=== Binary definition ===
According to the Cambridge International Dictionary of English, the concept of low-tech is simply defined as a technique that is not recent, or using old materials.

=== Recently: a wider and more balanced approach ===
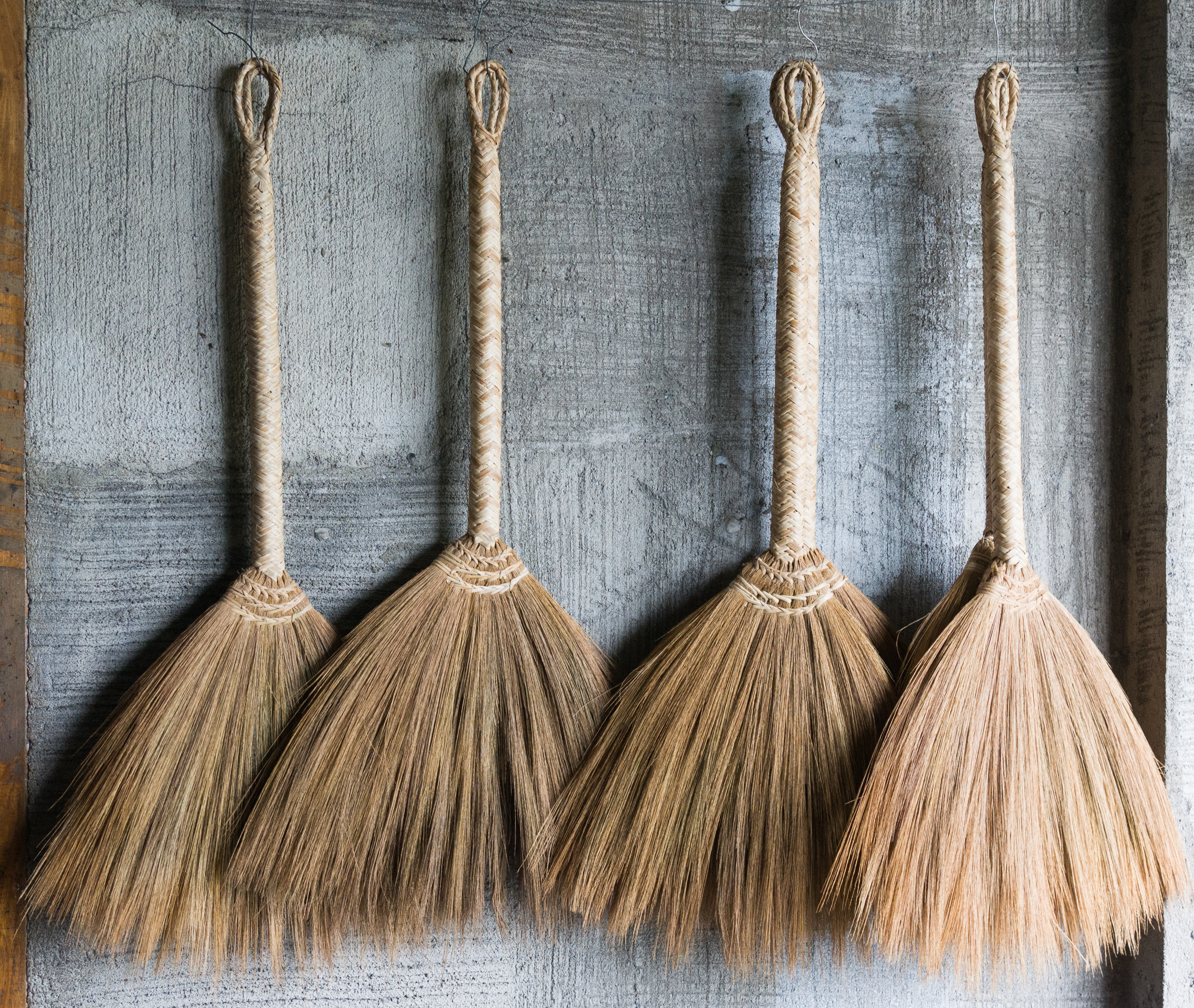
Handmade broom

A second, more nuanced definition of low-tech may appear. This definition takes into account the philosophical, environmental and social aspects. Low-tech are no longer restricted to old techniques, but also extended to new, future-oriented techniques, more ecological and intended to recreate social bounds. A low-tech innovation is then possible.

Contrary to the first definition, this one is much more optimistic and has a positive connotation. It would then oppose the planned obsolescence of objects (often "high-tech") and question the consumer society, as well as the materialist principles underneath. With this definition, the concept of low-tech thus implies that anyone could make objects using their intelligence, and share their know-how to popularize their creations. A low-tech must therefore be accessible to all, and could therefore help in reduction of inequalities.

Furthermore, some reduce the definition of low-tech to meet basic needs (eating, drinking, housing, heating ...), which disqualifies many technologies from the definition of low-techs, but this definition does not is not always accepted. Finally, considering that the definition of low-tech is relative, some prefer to use lower tech.

== Philosophy ==
In his book Small is beautiful (1973), Schumacher uses the concept of "intermediate technology", which corresponds fairly precisely to what "low tech" means. He also founded the Intermediate Technology Development Group, today known as Practical Action, in 1966.

== See also ==
- Obsolescence
- Do it yourself
- Anti-consumerism
- Degrowth
- Simple living
- Embodied energy
- Intermediate technology – sometimes used to mean technology between low and high technology
- Pre-industrial society

== Sources ==
- Falk, William W.; Lyson, Thomas A. (1988). High tech, low tech, no tech: recent industrial and occupational change in the South. SUNY Press. ISBN 978-0-88706-729-7.
- De Decker, Kris (2012). Low-tech magazine (tome 1 and 2). Low-tech Magazine. ISBN 978-1-79471-152-5.
- Berkes, Fikret (1999). Sacred Ecology (first ed.). Taylor & Francis Ltd. ISBN 1138071498.
- Watson, Julia (2020). Lo—TEK. Design by Radical Indigenism. Taschen. ISBN 978-3-8365-7818-9.
- Ginn, Peter (2019). Slow Tech: The Perfect Antidote to Today's Digital World. Haynes UK. ISBN 978-1-78521-616-9.
