= Columbia University Graduate School of Architecture, Planning and Preservation =

Architecture school of Columbia University

Coordinates: 40.80734°N 73.96049°W

- Type: Private architecture school
- Established: 1881
- Parent institution: Columbia University
- Dean: Andrés Jaque
- Faculty: 195 (academic staff)
- Students: 629 (total enrollment)
- Location: New York City, U.S.
- Campus: Urban
- Website: arch.columbia.edu

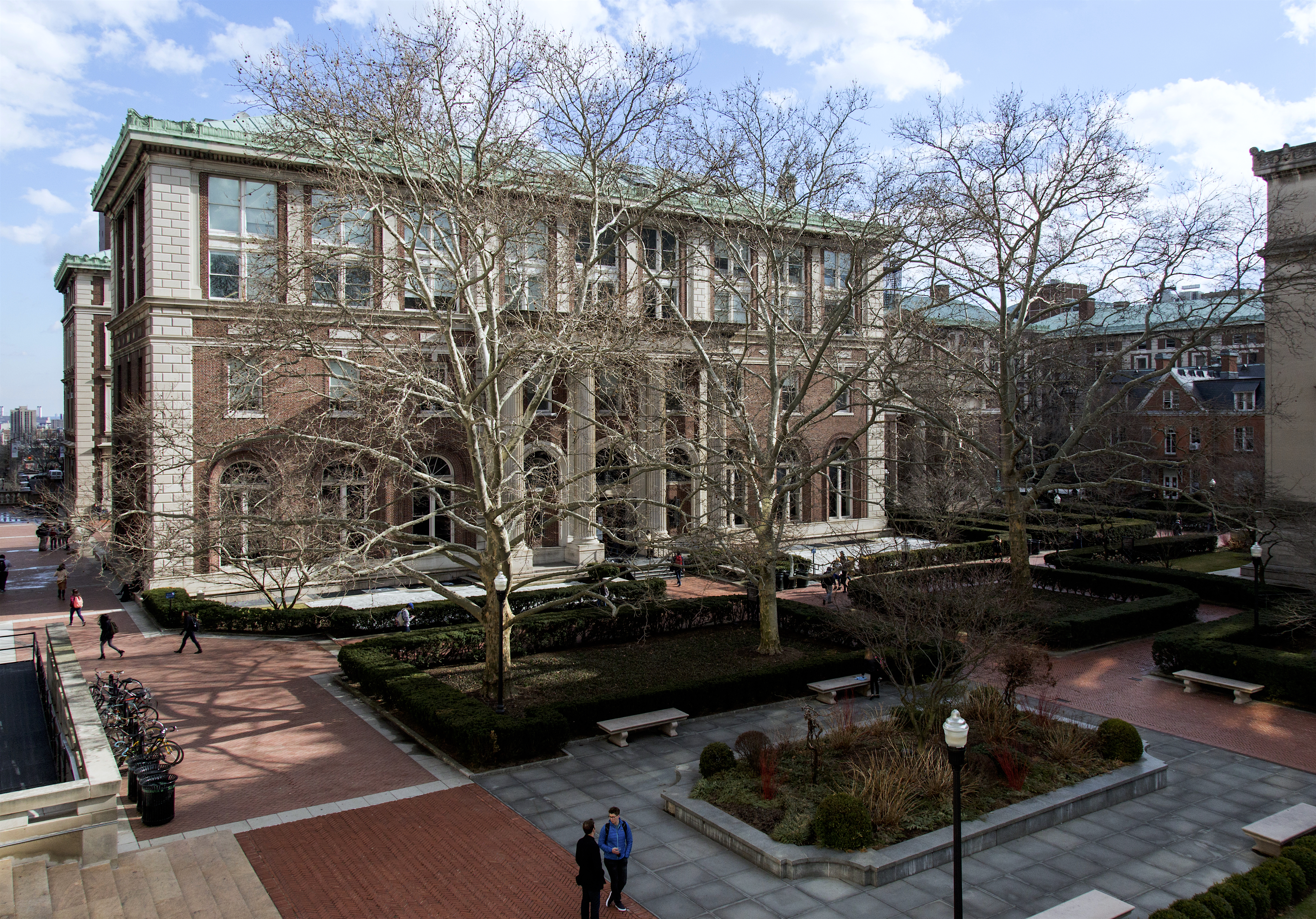
Avery Hall, Columbia University

The Columbia University Graduate School of Architecture, Planning and Preservation (GSAPP) is the architecture school of Columbia University, a private research university in New York City. It is also home to the Masters of Science program in Advanced Architectural Design, Computational Design Practice, Critical Curatorial & Conceptual Practices, Historic Preservation, Real Estate Development, Urban Design, and Urban Planning.

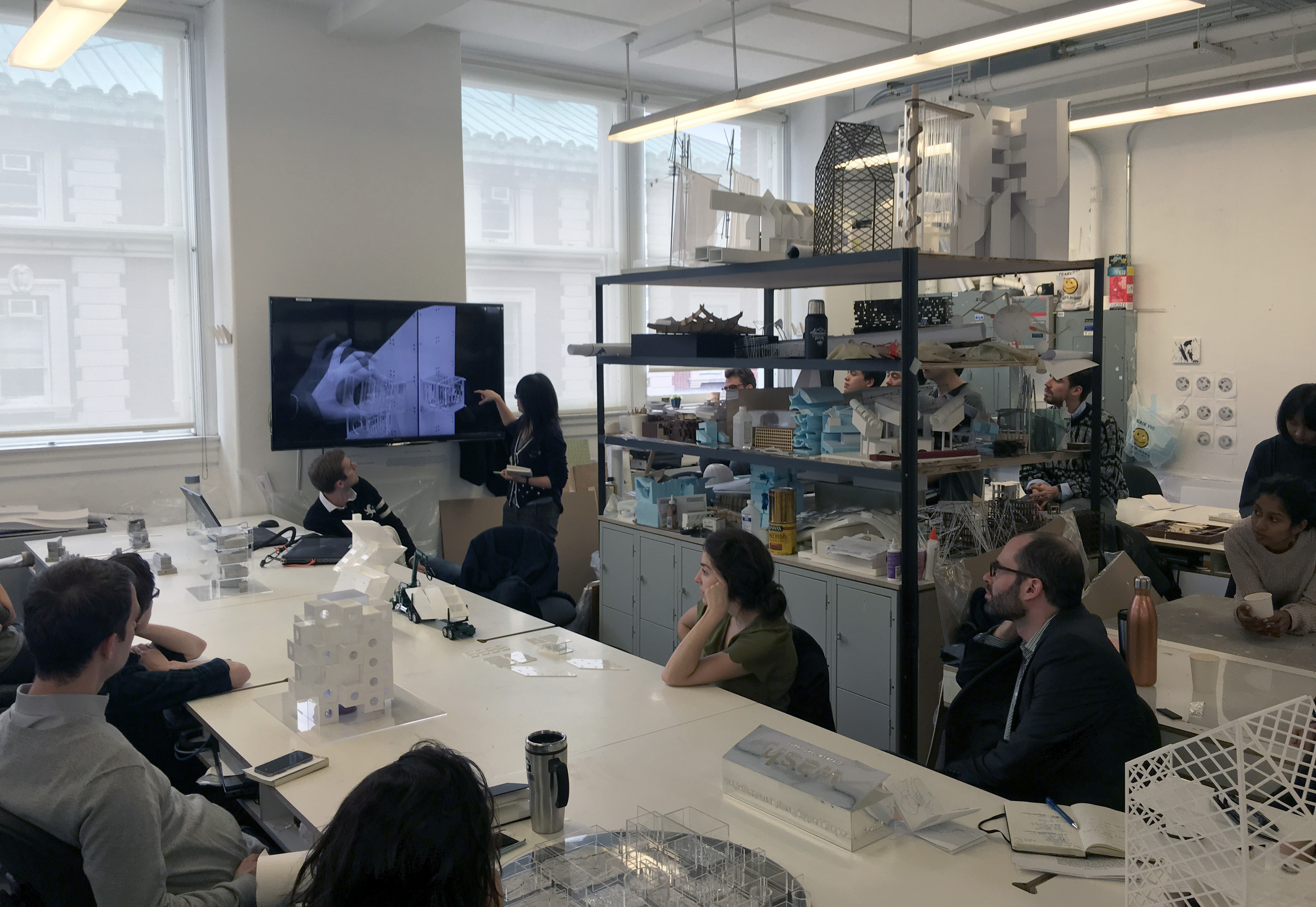
GSAPP Architecture Studios at Avery Hall

The school's resources include the Avery Architectural and Fine Arts Library, the United States' largest architectural library and home to some of the first books published on architecture, as well as the origin of the Avery Index to Architectural Periodicals.

Recent deans of the school include architects James Stewart Polshek (1972–1987), Bernard Tschumi (1988–2003), Mark Wigley (2004–2014), Amale Andraos (2014–2021), Weiping Wu (interim dean, 2022), and Andrés Jaque (2022–present).

== History ==
The Graduate School of Architecture, Planning, and Preservation has evolved over more than a century. It was transformed from a department within the Columbia School of Mines into a formal School of Architecture by William Robert Ware in 1881, making it one of the first such professional programs in the country.

While the number of specialized programs being offered by the school has increased over the years, architecture remains the intellectual core of the school.

== Rankings ==
Columbia GSAPP has been ranked #2 of the Top Architecture Graduate Programs five times over the past ten years on Design Intelligence's ranking of programs accredited by the National Architectural Accrediting Board, including in the 2020 rankings.

== Notable faculty ==
=== Current faculty ===
- Amale Andraos – founder of WORKac Architects and former dean (2014–2021)
- Barry Bergdoll – former Philip Johnson Chief Curator of Architecture and Design, MoMA
- Andrew Dolkart – James Marston Fitch Professor of Historic Preservation, former director of the Historic Preservation Program (2008–2016)
- Kenneth Frampton – Ware Professor of Architecture Emeritus
- Mario Gooden – director of GSAPP's Master of Architecture Program, founder and director of Mario Gooden Architect PLLC / Mario Gooden Studio
- Juan Herreros – founder of Abalos & Herreros
- Steven Holl – founder and principal of Steven Holl Architects
- Andrés Jaque – dean of GSAPP, director of its Advanced Architectural Design Program, founder and principal of Office for Political Innovation
- Laura Kurgan – director of GSAPP's Computational Design Program and director of the Center for Spatial Research
- Reinhold Martin – former director of the Temple Hoyne Buell Center for the Study of American Architecture
- Mary McLeod – co-curator of the exhibition Charlotte Perriand: Interior Equipment
- Kate Orff – director of GSAPP's Architecture and Urban Design Program, founder and principal of SCAPE
- Jorge Otero-Pailos – director of GSAPP's Historic Preservation Program
- Richard Plunz – director of Urban Design Lab at the Earth Institute and former director of GSAPP's Architecture and Urban Design Program
- Michael Rock – founder of 2 x 4, director of Graphical Arch Studies
- Karla Maria Rothstein – director of Columbia University's DeathLAB; co-founder of Latent Productions
- Hilary Sample – founder and principal of MOS Architects
- Felicity Scott – co-director of GSAPP's Critical, Curatorial, and Conceptual Practices in Architecture Program
- Galia Solomonoff – architect of Dia:Beacon museum and founding creative director of Solomonoff Architecture Studio
- Bernard Tschumi – designed Alfred Lerner Hall, Columbia's student center, former dean (1988–2003)
- Julia Watson – author of Lo-TEK
- Mark Wigley – directed the exhibition "Deconstructivist Architecture" at MoMA with Philip Johnson, former dean (2004–2014)
- Gwendolyn Wright
- Weiping Wu – director of GSAPP's Urban Planning Program and former interim dean

=== Former faculty ===
- Charles Abrams
- Stan Allen – former dean of Princeton School of Architecture
- Tatiana Bilbao
- William A. Boring
- Peter Cook – member of Archigram
- Harvey Wiley Corbett
- Mark Cousins – director of the History/Theory Department at the AA London
- Manuel de Landa (adjunct)
- Neil Denari
- Hernan Diaz Alonso
- James Marston Fitch
- Frank Gehry
- Romaldo Giurgola
- Percival Goodman
- Sigurd Grava
- Zaha Hadid
- Alfred Dwight Foster Hamlin
- Wallace Harrison
- Thomas Hastings
- Henry Hornbostel
- Malo Huston – dean of the School of Architecture at the University of Virginia (2021–present)
- Bjarke Ingels
- Gerhard Kallmann
- Ada Karmi-Melamede
- Michael David Kirchmann – founder and CEO of GDSNY
- Austin W. Lord – dean 1912–1915
- Greg Lynn
- Peter Marcuse
- Charles Follen McKim
- Michael McKinnell
- James Stewart Polshek – former dean of Columbia's architecture school; his projects include the Clinton Presidential Center in Little Rock; the Santa Fe Opera's Crosby Theatre in New Mexico; and 500 Park Avenue near Billionaires' Row in Manhattan
- Philippe Rahm
- Hani Rashid – co-founder of Asymptote Architecture
- Jaquelin T. Robertson
- Michael Sorkin
- Robert A.M. Stern – former dean of Yale School of Architecture; his recent projects include the Four Seasons Hotel New York Downtown; the Harvard Business School's Bloomberg Center; and the Harvard Kennedy School's Rubenstein, Ofer, and Wexner buildings
- Raymond Unwin
- Lauretta Vinciarelli
- William Robert Ware – designed numerous Venetian Gothic buildings for Harvard University
- Michael Webb – member of Archigram

== Notable alumni ==
- Max Abramovitz (1931) – 1961 Rome Prize; designed Avery Fisher Hall at Lincoln Center, the United Nations complex, and the Assembly Hall
- Abraham H. Albertson (1895) – early 20th-century architect in Seattle, Washington
- David Aldrich – artist and architect
- Grosvenor Atterbury (1884) – worked for Columbia campus architects McKim, Mead & White; designed Forest Hills Gardens
- Richard F. Bach (1909) – curator of industrial arts at the Metropolitan Museum of Art
- Turpin Bannister (M.S. 1928) – one of the leading American architectural historians of his generation
- Donn Barber (post-graduate architectural courses) – architect
- William A. Boring – architect; co-designed the Immigration Station at Ellis Island in New York Harbor
- Temple Hoyne Buell – designed over 300 buildings in Colorado; designed the first ever shopping mall
- Roger Bullard – architect who designed America's Little House and Salutation
- Paul Byard (M.S.) – lawyer and architect
- Rosario Candela (B.A. 1915) – Italian-American architect; known for apartment building designs in New York City
- Eric Cantor (M.S. 1989) – congressman from Virginia and United States House majority leader
- Minsuk Cho – founder of Mass Studies
- Brad Cloepfil – architect, educator
- Jonas Coersmeier – award-winning architect and designer; finalist and first runner-up in the World Trade Center Memorial Competition
- William Adams Delano (1896) – architect, partner with Chester Holmes Aldrich in the firm of Delano & Aldrich
- Andrew Dolkart (M.S. 1977) – authority on the preservation of historically significant architecture
- Harry E. Donnell (Ph. B. 1887) – Beaux-Arts architect who designed The Grand Madison
- Alden B. Dow (B.A. 1931) – architect; known for his prolific architectural design
- Boris Dramov (M.Arch. 1970) – architect, urban designer, and President of ROMA Design Group
- Peter Eisenman (1960) – designed the Memorial to the Murdered Jews of Europe in Berlin
- Doug Farr (M.Arch. 1970) – architect and urban planner
- Martin Felsen (1994) – co-founder of UrbanLab; 2009 Latrobe Prize from the American Institute of Architects College of Fellows
- Nabil Gholam (M.S. in Urban Planning 1988) – architect, founder of award-winning architecture firms in Beirut
- Romaldo Giurgola (M.Arch) – Italian-American-Australian academic architect, professor, and author
- Philip L. Goodwin (1912) – co-designer of the original Museum of Modern Art, New York
- Ferdinand Gottlieb (1953) – designed the original Rizzoli Bookstore
- Frances Halsband (M.S.) – architect who has served on juries for design awards and chaired the 1999 American Institute of Architects Committee on Design
- Michael Hansmeyer (M.S.) – post-modern architect; utilizes algorithmic architecture techniques, generative art mentalities, and CAD software to generate complex structures
- Arthur Loomis Harmon (1902) – co-designed Empire State Building; design partner of the firm Shreve, Lamb and Harmon
- James Monroe Hewlett (Ph. B. 1890) – painted the celestial mural in the Grand Central Terminal, father-in-law of inventor Buckminster Fuller
- Henry Hornbostel (Ph. B. 1891) – architect who designed the campus for Carnegie Mellon University and Emory University
- John Ike – architect and partner of Ike Kligerman Barkley architectural firm
- Mitchell Joachim (M. Arch. 1997) – innovator in ecological design, architecture, and urban design
- Jeh V. Johnson (M. Arch. 1958) – architect, co-founder of the National Organization of Minority Architects (NOMA) and taught at Vassar College for many years
- Rockwell Kent (1902) – painter
- Robert Kohn (1890) – designed Congregation Emanu-El of the City of New York, the world's largest synagogue
- Joseph Kosinski (1999) – directed Tron: Legacy; best known for his computer graphics and computer generated imagery work
- Sylvia Lavin – a leading figure in contemporary architectural history, theory, and criticism
- V. Everit Macy (1893) – industrialist and philanthropist; benefactor to Teachers College, Columbia University
- Geeta Mehta – Indian-American social entrepreneur, urban designer, architect and author
- Aaron Neubert (M.Arch 1997) – Los Angeles-based architect and educator; founding principal of ANX and Fellow of the American Institute of Architecture
- Lewis F. Pilcher (1895) – state architect of New York in the 1910s
- John Russell Pope (1894) – Rome Prize; designed the National Archives and the Jefferson Memorial in Washington, DC
- Antoine Predock (B. Arch.) – architect, Rome Prize (1985); AIA Gold Medal (2006), National Design Award (2007)
- Wallace A. Rayfield (B. Arch. 1899) – the second formally educated practicing African-American architect in the United States
- Charles Renfro (1994) – principal, Diller Scofidio + Renfro; among the first architects to win a MacArthur Prize "genius grant"
- Marcus T. Reynolds (1893) – architect who designed the SUNY System Administration Building and The Albany Academy
- James Rossant (1928–2009) – architect; best known for his master plan of Reston, Virginia, Lower Manhattan Plan, and UN-sponsored master plan for Dodoma, Tanzania
- Friedrich St. Florian (M. Arch. 1961) – Austrian–American architect; Rome Prize; National World War II Memorial, Washington, D.C.
- Ashley Schafer (1998) – founding editor of PRAXIS journal, curator of the US Pavilion at the 2014 Venice Biennale
- Sy Schulman (1954) – civil engineer and urban planner, mayor of White Plains (1993–1997)
- Ricardo Scofidio (1960) – founder, principal of Diller Scofidio + Renfro, first architects to win a MacArthur Prize "genius grant"; Royal Institute of British Architects
- David Serero (M.S. Arch) – French architect; Rome Prize
- Lawrence L. Shenfield (B. Arch. 1914) – advertising executive, instrumental in promoting Radio broadcasting during the 1920s and 30s; prominent philatelist, collector of Confederate postage stamps
- Norma Merrick Sklarek (M.Arch 1950) – African-American architect who accomplished many firsts for black women in architecture
- Galia Solomonoff (M.Arch 1994) – architect, founder of Solomonoff Architecture Studio
- Laurinda Hope Spear (M.S. Arch 1975) – architect and landscape architect; Rome Prize; one of the founders of Arquitectonica
- Gustave E. Steinback (B.S. 1900) – architect; designer of Roman Catholic schools and churches
- Chauncey Stillman – heir, grandson of James Stillman
- Max Strang (M.Arch 1988) – Miami-based architect known for his Regional Modernist design; founding principal of Strang Design and recipient of Medal of Honor from Florida AIA
- Sharon Sutton (M.Arch 1983) – professor, architecture and urban design; first African American woman to become a full professor in an accredited architectural degree program
- John Almy Tompkins II – designed Forest Hills Gardens
- Alexander Tzannes (M.S. Arch & Urban Design) – Australian architect; founder of multi-award-winning architectural practice Tzannes Associates
- Franklin B. Ware (B.S. Arch) – architect; state architect of New York (1907–1912)
- Whitney Warren (attended 1883–1884) – founder of Warren and Wetmore, which designed New York City's Grand Central Terminal
- Alexander McMillan Welch (1890) – architect who designed the Benjamin N. Duke House
- Jan V. White (1952) – communication designer, educator and writer
- John Louis Wilson Jr., (B.Arch 1928; 1898–1989) – architect active in New York City; first Black graduate of the architecture program

== Research centers ==
=== Center for Spatial Research ===
The Spatial Research Center was established in 2015 as a center for urban research that combines design, architecture, urbanism, humanities, and data science. It sponsors research, and curricular activities built around new technologies of mapping, data visualization, data collection and data analysis.

=== Center for Urban Real Estate ===
The Center for Urban Real Estate was founded in 2011 in order to address the challenges of an urbanization and the complex problems of the real estate industry. From inequitable socio-economic outcomes in the urban environment, through the revitalization of urban centers, to creating technological systems for optimized investment decisions, the Center serves as a forum for discussions and analysis by real estate professionals and scholars. A focus of the Center is the development of technology that meets needs of the real estate industry, integrated with advanced research and resources in technology within the Columbia University ecosystem.

=== Temple Hoyne Buell Center for the Study of American Architecture ===
The Buell Center was founded in 1982. Its mission is to advance the interdisciplinary study of American architecture, urbanism, and landscape. In recent years, the Center has convened issue-oriented conversations around matters of public concern, such as housing, that are addressed to overlapping constituencies including academics, students, professionals, and members of the general public. The Center's research and programming articulate facts and frameworks that modify key assumptions in which public analysis and debate about architecture and urbanism takes place. The center is located in Buell Hall.

=== Columbia Laboratory for Architectural Broadcasting ===
Columbia Laboratory for Architectural Broadcasting (also known as C-Lab) was founded in 2005 by Jeffrey Inaba. It is an experimental research unit which investigates how cities would evolve and studies urban and architecture issues related to new technologies.
