= Galia Solomonoff =

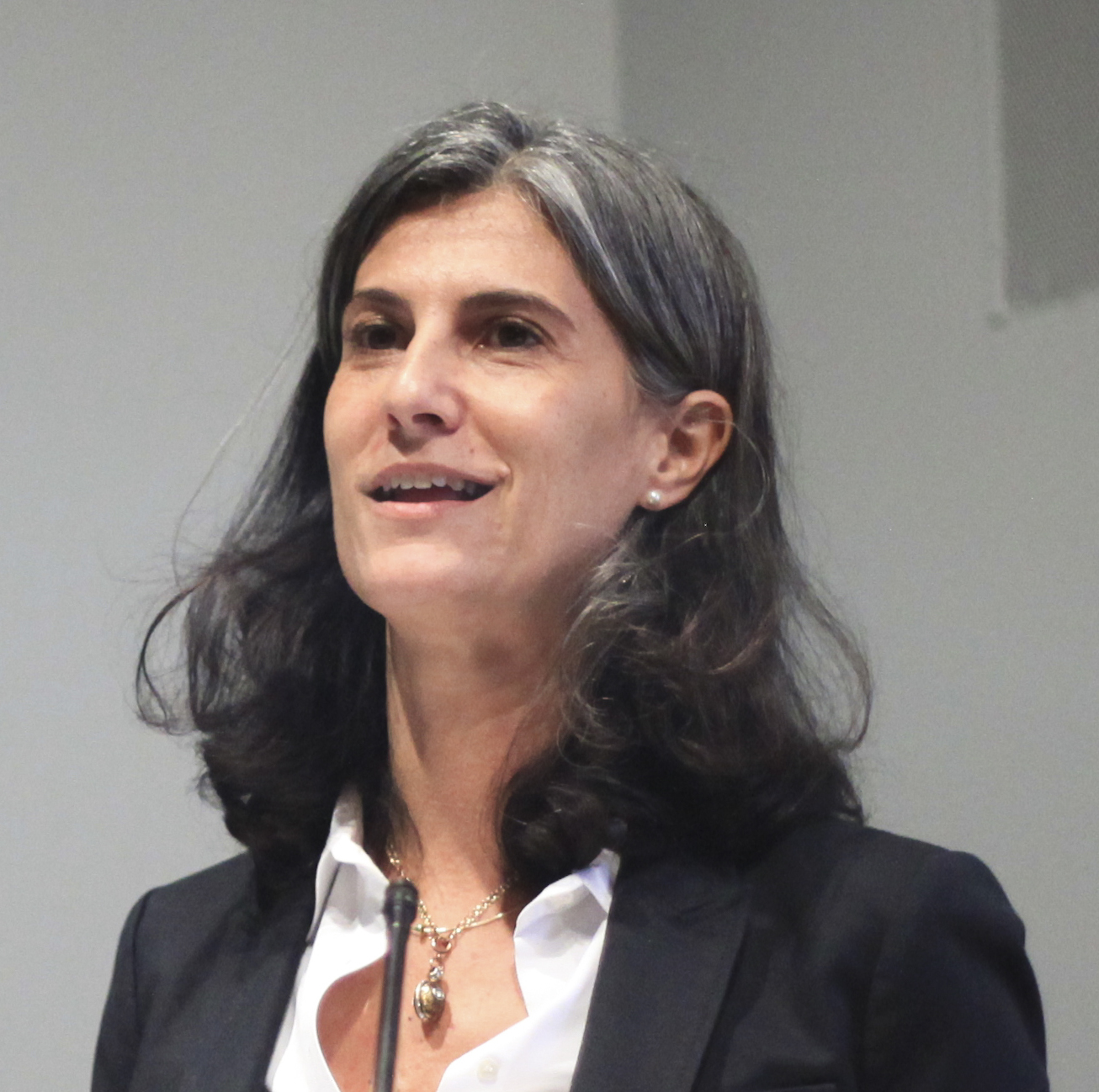
- Born: 1968 (age 57–58); Rosario, Santa Fe

Galia Solomonoff is an architect and the founding creative director of New York-based architecture and design firm Solomonoff Architecture Studio. Her notable projects include Dia:Beacon; the Defective Brick Project; multiple residential projects in Manhattan and Brooklyn; and competition proposals for international institutional projects.

== Biography ==
Solomonoff received her master's degree in Architecture from Columbia University, where she was awarded the McKim Prize for Excellence in Design and the William Kinne Fellows Traveling Prize, and her Sc.B. in Architecture from the City College of New York in 1991.

Prior to founding SAS, Solomonoff worked with OMA/Rem Koolhaas (Office for Metropolitan Architecture), Rafael Viñoly, and Bernard Tschumi Architects, as well as OpenOffice. She has taught at the Rhode Island School of Design, Princeton University, Cooper Union, Yale University, and Columbia University's Graduate School of Architecture, Planning, and Preservation. Solomonoff is the recipient of two AIA Design Awards, grants from the New York Foundation for the Arts and the National Endowment for the Arts, and recognition in the Architectural League of New York's Emerging Voices series. She has been featured in the New York Times, New York Magazine's premiere issue of editor Wendy Goodman's stand-alone Design Hunting, More Magazine, and Designers & Books. In 2007, New York named her part of New York's "next garde".

== Selected projects ==
- Dia:Beacon
- Kaffe 1668
- Lillian Ball Studio
- Tribeca Apartment
- Park Avenue South Lobby Renovation
- East Village Condominiums
- Brooklyn Townhouse and Photography Studio
- Chelsea Loft
- West Village Carriage House

== Selected publications ==
- Post-Ductility: Metals in Architecture and Engineering, eds. Michael Bell and Craig Buckley (Cambridge: MIT Press, 2012)
- Public Housing: A New Conversation (New York: Temple Hoyne Buell Center for the Study of American Architecture, Columbia University GSAPP, 2009)
- Layered Urbanisms: Gregg Pasquarelli / Galia Solomonoff / Mario Gooden (New York: W.W. Norton & Co., 2008 )
- Latin American Architecture: Six Voices (Studies in Architecture and Culture, No 5)
- “Defecting Fame,” Perspecta 37 (2005): 122-130
