= Weiping Wu =

Columbia University Professor and China Urban Specialist

- 吴维平
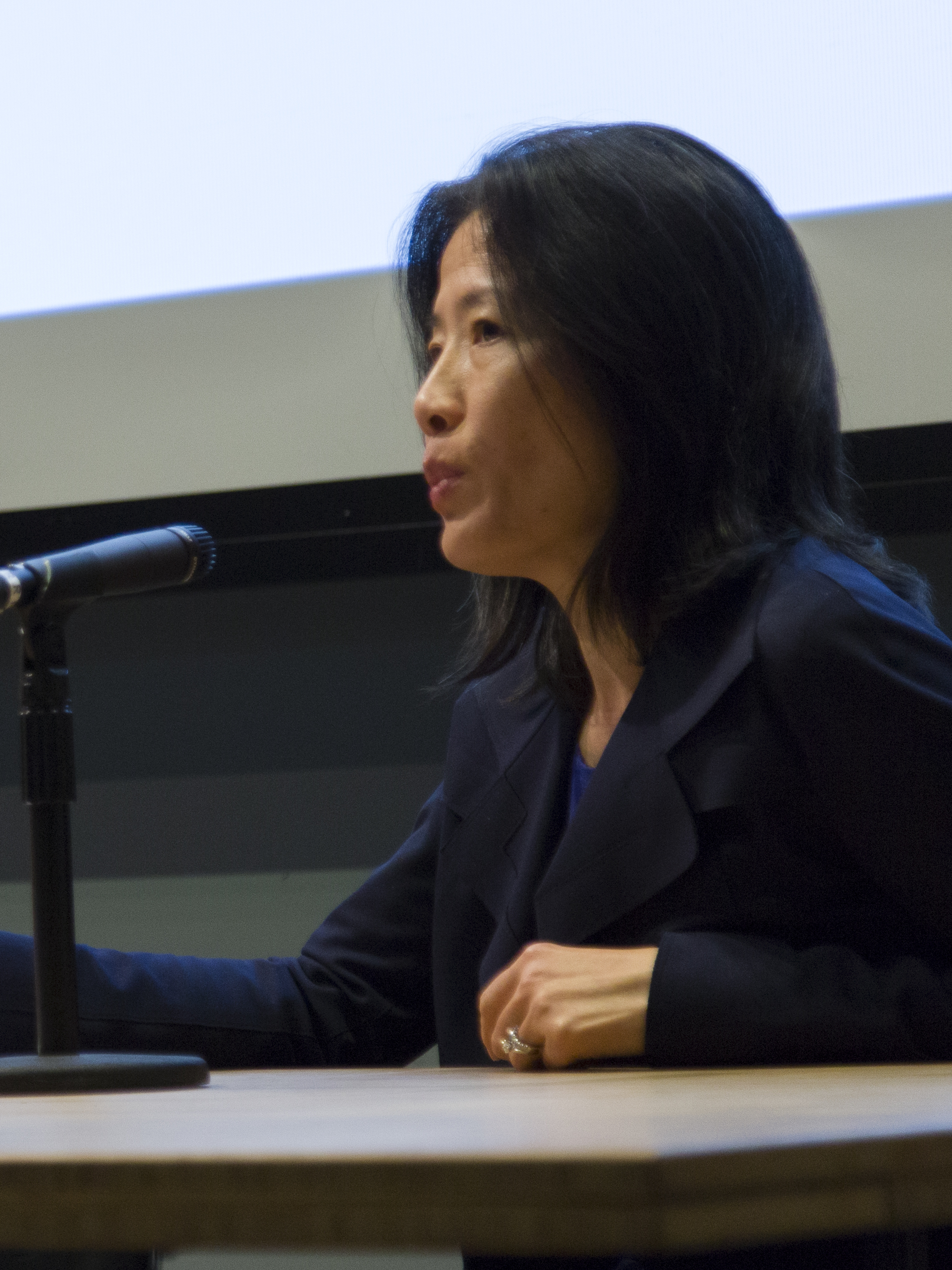
- Wu at GSAPP in 2016
- Occupation: Urbanist
- Title: Professor

Academic background
- Education: Tsinghua University
- Alma mater: Rutgers University

Academic work
- Discipline: Urban planner
- Sub-discipline: Urbanization; migration; comparative studies
- Institutions: Columbia GSAPP; Tufts University; Virginia Commonwealth University
- Main interests: Urban development and urbanization in China
- Notable works: The Chinese City (2012)

Weiping Wu (Chinese: 吴维平) is a China urban specialist and Professor at Columbia University's Graduate School of Architecture, Planning and Preservation, where she directs the Urban Planning program. In January 2022, she was appointed interim dean and served until August. She became the Vice Provost for Academic Programs at Columbia in September 2023.

Wu was appointed as the President of the Association of Collegiate Schools of Planning (ACSP) from Fall 2017 through Fall 2019, and was editor of ACSP's Journal of Planning Education and Research from 2008 to 2012.

== Education ==
Wu holds a Ph.D. in Urban Planning and Policy Development from Rutgers University, and a master's degree in Urban Planning and a bachelor's degree in Architecture from Tsinghua University (China).

== Academic life ==
Wu is a Professor of Urban Planning at Columbia GSAPP and Director of the M.S. Urban Planning program. Before joining Columbia University in 2016, she was Professor and Chair in the Department of Urban and Environmental Policy and Planning at Tufts University. She is also on the faculty of the Weatherhead East Asian Institute at Columbia.

== Publications ==
- 2012 The Chinese City, Weiping Wu, Piper Gaubatz, Routledge ISBN 978-0415575751
- “Migrant Housing in Urban China: Choices and Constraints.” Urban Affairs Review 38, no. 1 (September 2002): 90–119. https://doi.org/10.1177/107808702401097817.
