= Ashley Schafer =

American architect

Ashley Schafer is a professor of architecture at the Ohio State University, where she was head of architecture from 2005 to 2009. Prior to joining the faculty at Ohio State, she was an associate professor of architecture at the Harvard Graduate School of Design.

She has played an important role in the development of architectural discourse in North America, and her writing is internationally known. Schafer is the founding co-editor of the scholarly journal PRAXIS, which is the leading project-based academic architectural publication in North America. The journal has received numerous awards and honors and has twice been awarded the largest grant in Design from the National Endowment for the Arts.

She is a curator for the U.S. Pavilion at the 14th International Venice Biennale of Architecture.

She received a Bachelor of Science in Architecture degree from the University of Virginia in 1986 and a Master of Architecture degree from Columbia University (GSAPP) in 1998.
