= Sigurd Grava =

Sigurd "Sig" Grava (September 25, 1934 – 2009) was an American scholar, professor emeritus, member of the faculty of Graduate School of Architecture, Planning and Preservation, Columbia University, from 1960, as a professor of Urban Planning.

Grava was born on September 25, 1934 in Riga in Latvia. He attended City College, New York, graduating in 1955, and then did his master's degree (1957) and Ph.D. (1965) at the Graduate School of Architecture, Planning and Preservation of Columbia University, and was a member of the Urban Planning faculty of this school from 1960. He served as Chairman of the Columbia University Architecture School's Division of Urban Planning from 1970 to 1974, and as Director of the Urban Planning Program in 1990–1993.

He published Urban Planning Aspects of Water Pollution Control (Columbia University Press; 1969) and Urban Transportation Systems. Choices for Communities (McGraw-Hill; 2003).
