= Richard F. Bach =

American curator

Richard Franz Bach
- Born: 1888
- Died: 1968 (aged 79–80); Bronx, New York
- Occupation: Curator
- Spouse: Maude Bransford Bach

Richard Franz Bach (1888-1968) was an American curator with the Metropolitan Museum of Art. He was known as a supporter of collaboration between museums and the industrial arts.

== Career ==
Richard F. Bach graduated with an A.B. from Columbia University in 1909 and during 1909-1919 was an instructor and curator at the Columbia School of Architecture. He served as the Acting Librarian of Avery Library from 1918 to 1920. In 1918, Bach was appointed Associate in Industrial Arts at the Metropolitan Museum of Art. In this position, Bach's main role was to facilitate use of the Museum’s collections as practical resources by manufacturers, designers, artisans, and craftsmen. Bach was also primarily responsible for organizing a series of popular exhibitions devoted to American industrial art. Over the course of his career at the Museum, Bach also served as Director of Industrial Relations (1929-1941), Dean of Education and Extension (1941-1949), and Consultant in Industrial Arts (1949-1952). After World War II, Bach tried unsuccessfully to provide services at the Museum for veterans, attempting to coordinate the efforts of rehabilitation and occupational therapist with the Museum's Education Department.

As the Director of Industrial Relations, Bach supervised the Museum’s Neighborhood Exhibitions, a series of thematic shows of Museum objects that traveled to various parts of New York City between 1933 and 1941. The purpose of the program was "to reach people in outlying districts [...] for whom a visit to the Museum seems a journey," "to serve crowded quarters of the city in which facilities for recreation and enjoyment are limited," and "to make available to the high schools of the city original objects of art which may serve as source material for study in relation to regular school subjects." The program included over fifty installations in four boroughs, drawing an attendance of over 1.5 million visitors in the first five years, and was installed in various public locations including "three settlement houses, thirteen high schools, six library branches, four colleges, one museum, two "Y" branches, and one City administration building." Locations which hosted these installations included the Queens Borough Public Library in Elmhurst, Queens, the Hudson Park Library branch of the New York Public Library in Greenwich Village, Manhattan, Washington Irving High School, and Christopher Columbus High School.

During the late 1940s, Bach corresponded with United Nations Educational, Scientific, and Cultural Organization regarding copyright division, seeking support and guidance for design copyright legislation in the United States. From 1952 to 1961, he served as an educational advisor to the American Institute of Interior Designers. He also served as a member and leader of a number of arts and education organizations including the American Federation of Arts, the Architectural League of New York, and the Advisory Board on Vocational Education of the New York City Board of Education.

== Publications ==
- "Industrial art: A war emergency." Bulletin of the Metropolitan Museum of Art 13(9): 194–196 (1918).
- "Museums and the factory: Making the galleries work for the art trades." Scribner’s Magazine LXXI(6): 763–768 (1922).
- Museums and the Industrial World. The Gilliss Press, New York, N.Y. (1926).
- "Fourth exhibition of work by manufacturers and designers." Bulletin of the Metropolitan Museum of Art 15(3): 49–51 (1929).
- "Contemporary American Industrial Art: Twelfth exhibition." Bulletin of the Metropolitan Museum of Art 26(10): 228 (1931).
