= University of Minnesota Press =

University publishing house

- Status: Active
- Founded: 1925
- Country of origin: United States
- Headquarters location: Minneapolis, Minnesota
- Distribution: Chicago Distribution Center
- Publication types: Books, academic journals.
- Official website: www.upress.umn.edu

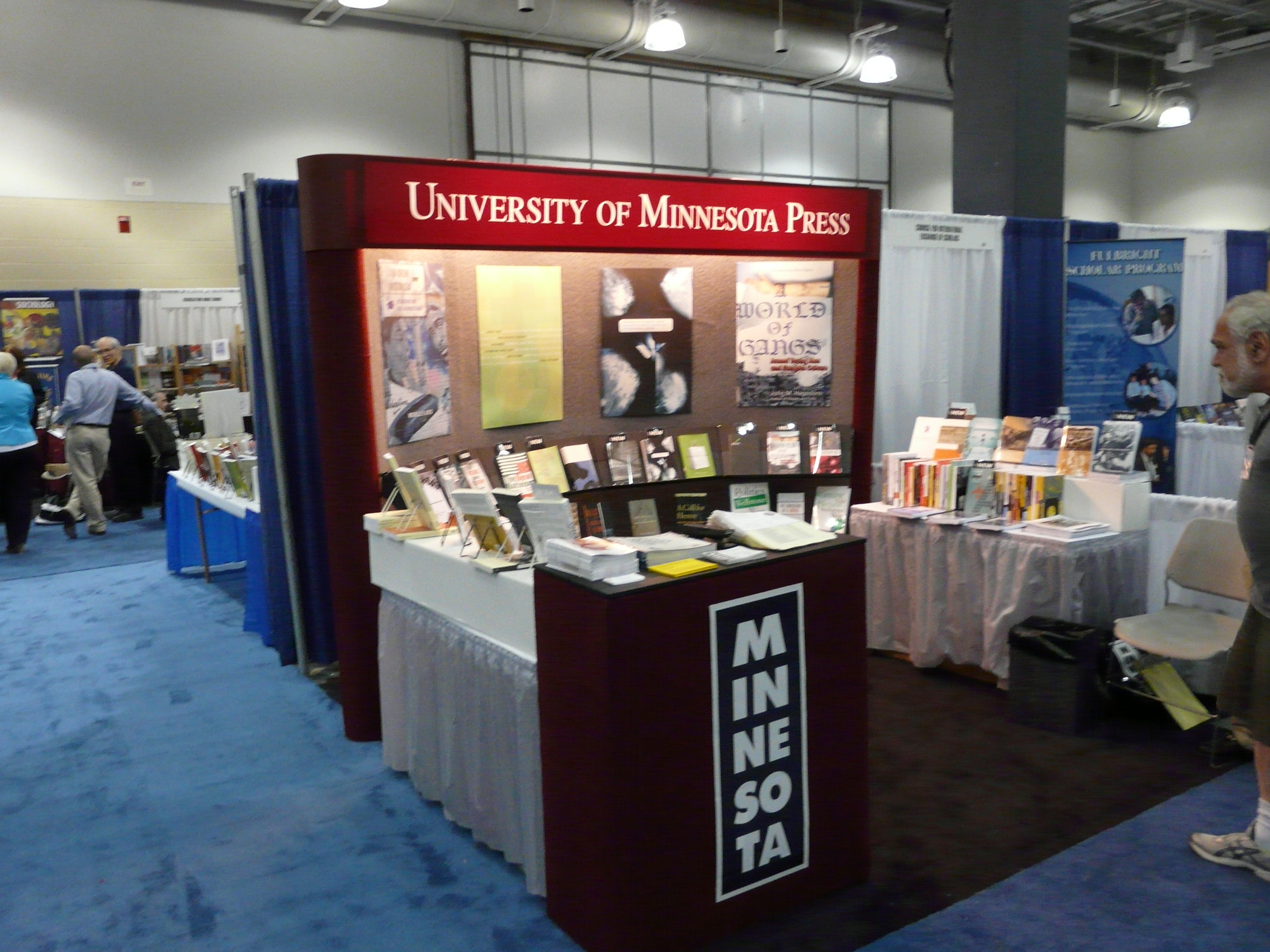
2008 conference booth

The University of Minnesota Press is a university press that is part of the University of Minnesota. It had annual revenues of just over $8 million in fiscal year 2018.

Founded in 1925, the University of Minnesota Press is best known for its books in social theory and cultural theory, critical theory, race and ethnic studies, urbanism, feminist criticism, and media studies.

The University of Minnesota Press also publishes a significant number of translations of major works of European and Latin American thought and scholarship, as well as a diverse list of works on the cultural and natural heritage of the state and the upper Midwest region.

== Journals ==
The University of Minnesota Press's catalog of academic journals totals thirteen publications:

- Buildings & Landscapes: Journal of the Vernacular Architecture Forum
- Critical Ethnic Studies
- Cultural Critique
- Environment, Space, Place
- Future Anterior
- Journal of American Indian Education
- Mechademia: Second Arc
- The Moving Image: The Journal of the Association of Moving Image Archivists
- Native American and Indigenous Studies
- Norwegian-American Studies
- Preservation Education and Research
- Verge: Studies in Global Asias
- Wíčazo Ša Review

== Controversies ==
University of Minnesota Press joined The Association of American Publishers trade organization in the Hachette v. Internet Archive lawsuit which resulted in the removal of access to over 500,000 books from global readers.

== See also ==
- List of English-language book publishing companies
- List of university presses
