= Mary McLeod (academic) =

Architecture professor

Academic background
- Education: Princeton University
- Thesis: Urbanism and utopia : Le Corbusier from regional syndicalism to Vichy (2007)

Mary Caroline McLeod is a professor of architectural history and theory at Columbia University known for her examination of modern architecture, especially the work of Le Corbusier. She is a fellow of the Society of Architectural Historians, and has received many fellowships and awards, including a Brunner Award, Fulbright Fellowship, NEH award, and grants from New York Council of the Arts and the Graham Foundation.

== Education and career ==
McLeod has a B.S., M.Arch, and a Ph.D. from Princeton University. As of 2021, she is a professor of architecture at Columbia Graduate School of Architecture, Planning and Preservation (GSAPP). She has also previously worked as a professor at Harvard University, the Institute for Architecture and Urban Studies, University of Miami, and University of Kentucky.

McLeod's essays have been published in journals and anthologies such as Oppositions, Assemblage, Art Journal, Harvard Design Magazine, AA Files, JSAH, Casabella, The Sex of Architecture, Architecture in Fashion, Architecture of the Everyday, Architecture and Feminism, The Pragmatist Imagination, Architecture Theory since 1968, The State of Architecture, Fragments: Architecture and the Unfinished, Le Parole dell'Architettura, and Modern Women: Women Artists at The Museum of Modern Art. Her main focus is on modern architecture specially Le Corbusier and she received the Arnold Brunner grant in 2015 which she used to research Le Corbusier's response to World War II.

In 2019, McLeod was one of three who study architecture and joined to discuss Bauhaus architecture with Architectural Record. McLeod has also published on the English architect Alan Colquhoun and organized the 2021 colloquium celebrating his life. McLeod and Victoria Rosner led an effort to expand knowledge about women in architecture through five years of research in the field. Regarding women in architecture, McLeod has been quoted in the Christian Science Monitor for her work noting that female architects "...don't have as much panache for the big glitter jobs". The website Pioneering Women of American Architecture, launched by the Beverly Willis Architecture Foundation in 2017, continues to make visible the achievements of women's contributions to American architecture.

== Selected bibliography ==
- McLeod, Mary (2014). Colquhonery : Alan Colquhoun from bricolage to myth. London: Architectural Association. ISBN 978-1-907896-52-1.
- Charlotte Perriand : an art of living. Charlotte Perriand, Mary Caroline McLeod, Roger Aujame, Architectural League of New York. New York: H.N. Abrams, in association with the Architectural League of New York. 2003. ISBN 0-8109-4503-7. OCLC 50844042.

== Recognition ==
In 2020, McLeod was named a fellow of the Society of Architectural Historians.
