= Amale Andraos =

American architect

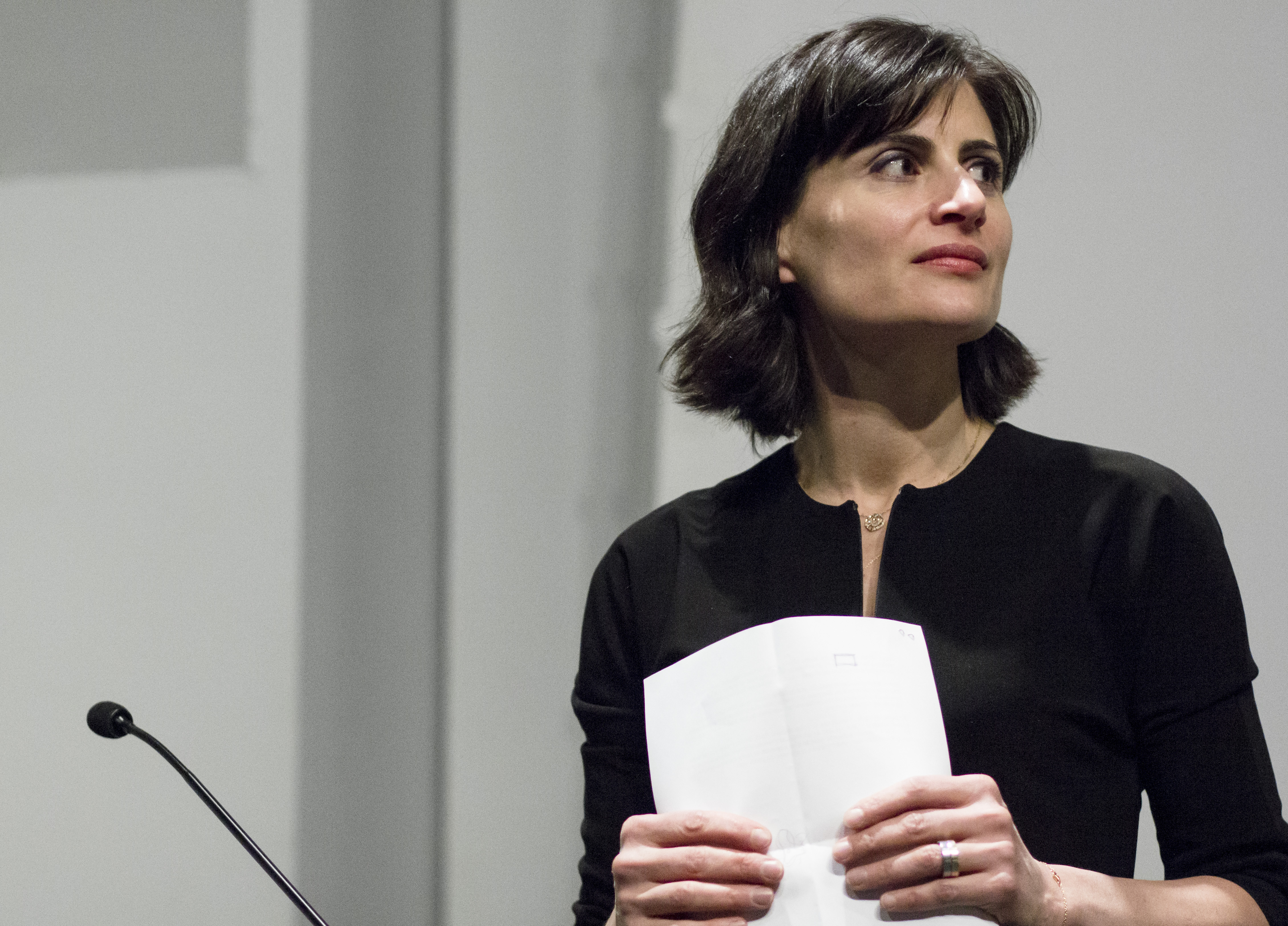
- Andraos at 2015 Koolhaas Lecture
- Born: 1973; Beirut, Lebanon
- Education: McGill University (B. Arch, 1996); Harvard University (M.Arch., 1999)
- Occupation: Architect
- Practice: Work Architecture Company
- Projects: Centre de Conferences in Libreville, Gabon; New Holland Island Cultural Center Masterplan; Edible Schoolyards at PS216 in Brooklyn and PS7 in Harlem, New York; Wieden+Kennedy New York Headquarters; Stealth Building; Miami Museum Garage; RISD Student Center

Amale Andraos (born 1973) is a New York-based architect. She was dean of the Columbia Graduate School of Architecture, Planning and Preservation (2014–2021) and serves as advisor to the Columbia Climate School. She is the co-founder of the New York City architecture firm WORKac with her husband, Dan Wood. Her impact on architectural practice around the world was recognized when she was named Honorary Fellow of the Royal Architectural Institute of Canada in 2021.

== Early years ==
Andraos was born in Beirut in 1973. Her father, Farid Andraos, was an architect and painter. Following the outbreak of the Lebanese Civil War, her family moved to Al Khobar, Saudi Arabia, when she was three; her father established a prefabricated housing company there.The family subsequently lived in Paris before settling in Montreal when she was seventeen.

She initially studied economics for a year at McGill University before switching to architecture, earning a Bachelor of Science in Architecture in 1994 and a Bachelor of Architecture in 1996. She received a Master of Architecture from Harvard University’s Graduate School of Design in 1999.

== Work ==
Andraos has taught at Princeton University School of Architecture, Harvard Graduate School of Design, the University of Pennsylvania School of Design and the American University in Beirut. In 2014, she was named dean of the Columbia Graduate School of Architecture, Planning and Preservation. She was the first woman to hold that position. Her publications include We Will Get There When We Cross That Bridge (Monacelli Press, 2017), The Arab City: Architecture and Representation (Columbia Books on Architecture and the city, 2016), 49 Cities (Inventory Press, 3rd edition, 2015), and Above the Pavement, the Farm! (Princeton Architectural Press, 2010).

Andraos was named one of the "25 Most Admired Educators for 2016" by DesignIntelligence, which describes her as integrating "real world problems into the curriculum with a bold vision and strong leadership." Furthermore, she recently served as an Advisor on Columbia University’s Climate Initiatives and for the newly-launched Climate School. Andraos is recognized as a thought leader, contributing widely to the field through her lectures and writings.

Andraos founded WORKac with her husband Dan Wood in 2003. The practice is based in New York City, with projects in the U.S. and abroad. The practice has achieved international recognition for projects such as Public Farm 1 for MoMA PS1 Young Architects Program, the Edible Schoolyards at PS216 in Brooklyn and PS7 in Harlem, NY, the new office headquarters for Wieden+Kennedy, also in New York, a residential conversion of a historic New York cast-iron building titled the Stealth Building, the Miami Museum Garage, and the Rhode Island School of Design Student Center in Providence. Andraos describes her firms work as an "intersection of the urban, the rural, and the natural."

Before co-founding WORKac, Andraos held positions at Rem Koolhaas/OMA in Rotterdam and New York, Saucier + Perrotte in Montreal and Atelier Big City also in Montreal.

As of October 2015, Andraos serves as a board member for the Architectural League of New York and the AUB Faculty of Engineering and Architecture International Advisory Committee. She is also on the New Museum’s New INC. Advisory Council.

=== Beirut Museum of Art ===
In December 2018, WORKac, co-led by Andraos and Dan Wood, was appointed to design the Beirut Museum of Art (BeMA), replacing Hala Wardé’s HW Architecture, which had won the museum’s international architectural competition in 2016. WORKac had received a special mention from the competition jury.

In a March 2019 opinion article in L’Orient-Le Jour, architect Hala Wardé criticized the museum’s decision to replace the competition-winning design. She also criticized Andraos’s acceptance of the commission, stating that she had previously approached Andraos for support over the dispute.

In a published response, BeMA stated that nearly two years of negotiations with HW Architecture had failed to produce a contract. It said the competition conditions permitted it to appoint another team if an agreement could not be reached, and that WORKac’s appointment followed the formal termination of negotiations with Wardé.

== Awards and honors ==
=== 2021 ===
- AIA New York Archicture Merit Award – Rhode Island School of Design Student Center

=== 2020 ===
- ArchMarathon Awards, Honoree – Rhode Island School of Design Student Center

=== 2019 ===
- AN Interior Top 50 Award, The Architects’ Newspaper
- Finalist Technical Innovation Award, Parking Today Awards – Miami Museum Garage
- International Architecture Award, Parking & Transportation Center, The Chicago Athenaeum Museum of Architecture & Design – Miami Museum Garage
- 2019 Beazley Designs of the Year Award Nominee, The Design Museum in London – Miami Museum Garage
- 2019 Architizer A+Awards Jury Winner, Concepts – Plus – Architecture + Collaboration – Miami Museum Garage

=== 2018 ===
- Innovative Facility of the Year. NPA Innovation Award, National Parking Association – Miami Museum Garage
- Best Big Scale of the Year, AIA Miami Chapter, American Institute of Architects – Miami Museum Garage
- Honorable Mention, Best of Design Award, The Architect's Newspaper
- Parking Structure Design Awards of Excellence, Florida Parking & Transportation Association – Miami Museum Garage
- GarageMASterworks Award, Best New Urban Amenity, Municipal Arts Society – Kew Gardens Hills Library
- AIA NY Architecture Merit Award – Kew Gardens Hills Library

=== 2017 ===
- #1 Design Firm, Architect 50, Architect Magazine
- Game Changers 2017, Metropolis Magazine
- ArchDaily Building of the Year – Stealth Building
- AIA NY Architecture Merit Award – Stealth Building

=== 2016 ===
- New Generation Leader, Architectural Record Women in Architecture Award
- "From A to Zaha: 26 Women Who Changed Architecture," Architizer

=== 2015 ===
- AIA New York State Firm of the Year
- Arch Daily 2015 Building of the Year – Wieden+Kennedy Offices
- AIA New York State Honor Award for Urban Design – Beijing Horticultural Expo Masterplan
- Award for Excellence in Design – New York City Public Design Commission – Issue Project Room

=== 2014 ===
- Interior Design Best Of Year Award – Wieden+Kennedy Offices
- AIA New York State Design Citation – Edible Schoolyard at P.S. 216
- MASterworks Award – Best Green Design Initiative, Municipal Arts Society – Edible Schoolyard at P.S. 216
- AIA NY Merit Interior Architecture Award – Wieden+Kennedy Offices

=== 2013 ===
- AIA NY Merit Interior Architecture Award – Children's Museum of the Arts
- AIA NY Merit Award for Urban Design – New Holland Island
- AIA Houston Merit Award for Renovation – Blaffer Art Museum
- City of Houston "Best Of" Awards: Best College Campus Building, and Best Artistic Renovation – Blaffer Art Museum

=== 2010 ===
- Award for Excellence in Design – New York City Public Design Commission

=== 2009 ===
- National Design Award Finalist – Interiors – Cooper Hewitt Design Museum
- Engineering Excellence Diamond Award – Structural Systems – ACEC New York
- AIA NY State Merit Award for Architecture – Public Farm 1

=== 2008 ===
- Best of the Best Awards, McGraw Hill Construction
- Structural Engineering Merit Award – Public Farm 1 – SEAoNY
- Year in Architecture, Top Ten Designs – New York Magazine – Public Farm 1
- Project of the Year: Park/Landscape, National – New York Construction/ENR
- Best Landscape/Urban Design Project, Regional – New York Construction
- Best of Year Award, Interior Design Magazine
- AIA NY Chapter Merit Interior Architecture Award – Anthropologie Dos Lagos
- Emerging Voices – Architectural League of New York
- MASterwork Award – Best Historic Renovation, Municipal Arts Society – Diane von Furstenberg Studio HQ
- Young Architects Program – MoMA PS1 Contemporary Art Center

=== 2007 ===
- "New York Designs" – Architectural League

=== 2006 ===
- AIA NY Chapter Merit Interior Architecture Award – Lee Angel Showroom
- Design Vanguard – Architectural Record
- New Practices, New York – AIA NY and The Architects' Newspaper

== Selected writing ==
- 2019: “Problematizing the Regional Context: Representation in the Arab and Gulf Cities,” in The New Arab Urban: Gulf Cities of Wealth, Ambition, and Distress
- 2018: “The Timeliness of Architecture’s Eco-Visionary Practices,” in Eco-Visionaries: Art, Architecture, and New Media after the Anthropocene
- 2017: “Embodied Energy: Then and Now,” in Embodied Energy and Design
- 2016: "The Arab City: Architecture and Representation", Columbia Books on Architecture and the City
- 2015: "Beyond Bigness: Re-Reading the Peutinger Map," The Avery Review, Issue 01
- 2014: "Strategies of the Void," Perspecta 48: Amnesia
- 2013: "Visionary Urbanism and its Agency," Zawia, Issue 1: Utopia
- 2012: "Futura Bold," Another Pamphlet Issue 3: The Future!
- 2010: "Interviews," Praxis Journal: Issue 11&12: 11 architects 12 conversations
- 2009: "Public Farm 1," Design Ecologies (Princeton Architectural Press)
- 2008: "Depave the Parking Lot and Put Back Paradise," Architecture Magazine
- 2007: "Will the Real Dubai Please Stand Up?" Superlative City: Dubai and the Urban Condition in the Early Twenty-First Century; "Cadavre Exquis Lebanese" in Visionary Power: Producing the Contemporary City; "Dubai's Island Urbanism" in Cities from Zero
- 2006: "A Program Primer," Praxis Journal 8: reProgramming.
- 2005: "Why are we still learning from Las Vegas?" in Bidoun, Issue 04, Dubai
