= Julia Watson (landscape designer) =

Australian landscape designer

Julia Watson (born 1977) is an Australian born author, researcher, lecturer, and landscape designer based in New York City. She is an expert on nature-based indigenous technologies, and focuses on the intersection of anthropology, ecology and innovation. She is the founder and principal of Julia Watson Studio, a landscape and urban design studio.

Watson is the author of Lo-TEK: Design by Radical Indigenism, and teaches at the Columbia Graduate School of Architecture, Planning and Preservation in New York.

== Early life ==
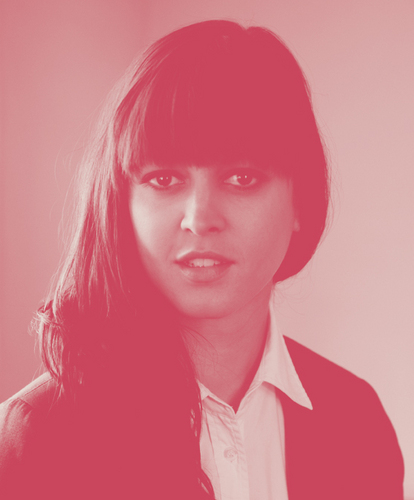
Watson

Julia Watson was born in 1977. She grew up in the West End of Brisbane, an inner city neighbourhood with rich indigenous history, which she credits for her interest in indigenous design. Her mother, born in Egypt, is a first-generation immigrant of Greek ethnicity, and her father is Australian.

Watson decided to pursue architecture in her teens, saying, "that decision came about in high school to console my parents who were worried because all I wanted was to be an artist."

== Education ==
Early in her education, Watson was exposed to a strong indigenous design methodology through the Aboriginal Environments Research Centre at the University of Queensland. There, she was taught by Paul Mammott on Aboriginal environments, which "lifted a veil" on her perception of landscape.

After receiving her BA in Architecture and Planning in 1998, she completed her Graduate Diploma of Landscape Architecture (GDLA) at the Queensland University of Technology in 2001. Her interest in indigenous design methodology carried on throughout her education, culminating in a move to the US in 2006 to pursue a Master of Landscape Architecture at the Harvard Graduate School of Design. There, she continued her studies focusing on sacred indigenous landscapes and their contestation, and graduating with a specialization in living landscape eco-technologies and the preservation of sacred cultural space. She earned the highest distinction in the landscape architecture department, graduating as both a Charles Eliot and Olmsted Fellow (2008).

== Career ==
=== Private practice ===
While studying landscape architecture at Queensland University of Technology, Watson worked for John Mongard and Jacqueline Ratcliffe at John Mongard Landscape Architects as a landscape technician. She then moved to London, where she worked for Lord Kenilworth at Randle Siddeley Associates on multiple landscape projects. Watson has also worked for Context Landscape Design in Sydney, and Toshiko Mori Architect in the US.

=== Teaching ===
Watson has taught Urban Design at Columbia Graduate School of Architecture, Planning, and Preservation, Harvard Graduate School of Design, Rhode Island School of Design, and Rensselaer Polytechnic Institute.

==== Fellowships ====
- Robert S. Brown Fellow (2013)
- Pop!tech Social Innovation Fellow (2013)
- REALITY Fellow (2016)

== Julia Watson Studio ==
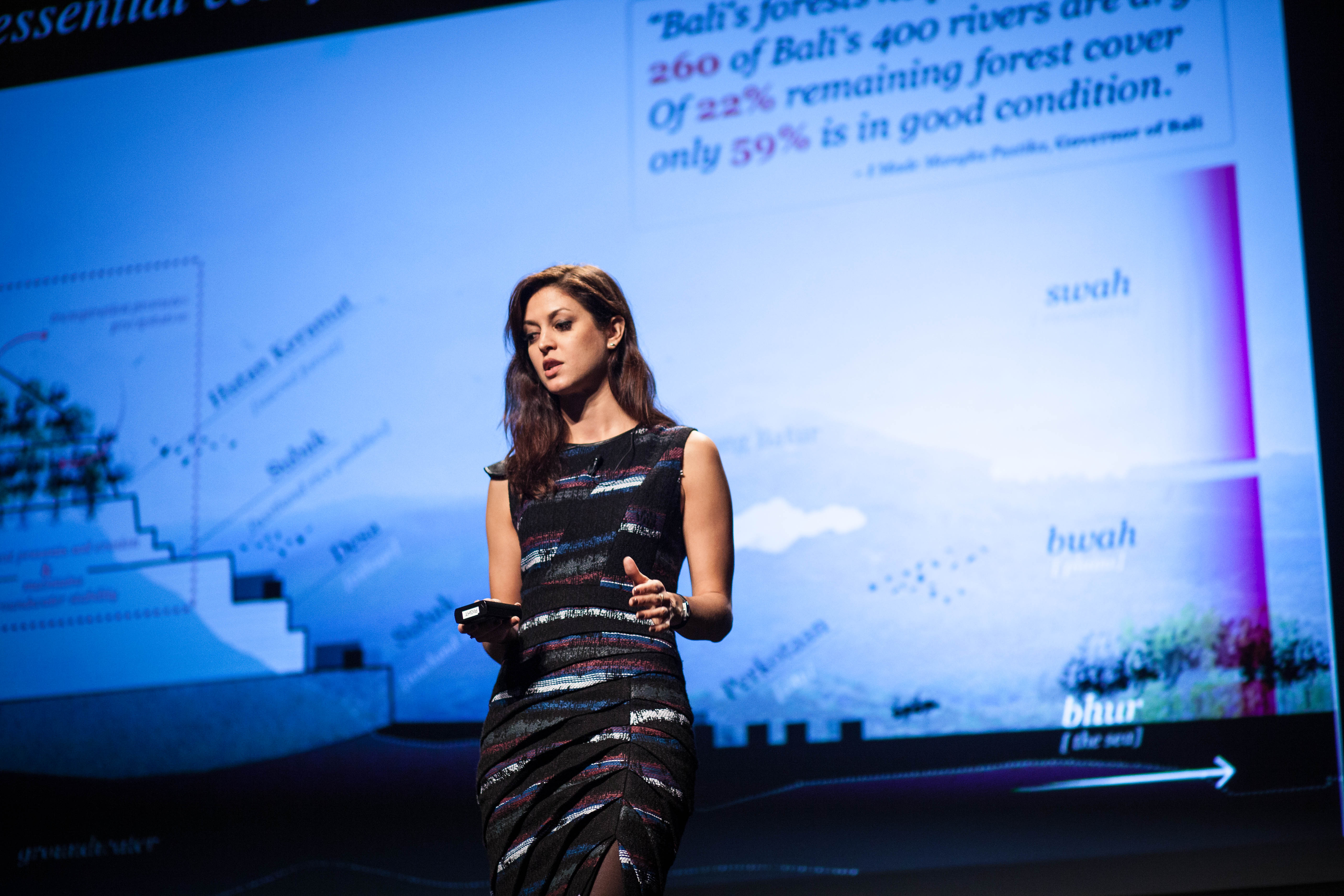
Watson speaking on her work with the Bali UNESCO World Heritage Site at PopTech, 2012

Watson's studio began as Studio REDE (Studio for Research and Design) in New York in 2013, shortly after graduating from the Harvard GSD. The studio was described as "working at the intersection of anthropology, ecology, innovation, and conservation". They worked on large-scale projects that merged Watson's human-centered design approach with a sensitive ecological approach, allowing users to engage with nature on both physical and spiritual levels. Studio REDE was framed as a design collaborative, bringing individuals from allied professions such as anthropologists, digital agencies, governments, and foundations to create partnerships with local communities with the goal of creating alternative co-management models.

On April 22, 2020, Watson joined Marie Salembier to formally launch their landscape and urban design studio Watson Salembier. The studio focused on local, site-specific interventions and rewilding spaces.

Watson is currently principal of her eponymous studio, Julia Watson Studio, which is a full service landscape and urban design studio that combines the ethical qualities of Studio REDE with the rewilding goals of Watson Salembier. They also work on a commission basis and consult for Fortune 500 companies to align their missions with global sustainability goals.

== Work ==
Watson's interest in indigenous technologies is displayed through her work with indigenous communities, such as the proposal for Bali's first UNESCO World Heritage Site, wherein she collaborated with Stephen Lansing.

She has authored numerous papers on indigenous technologies and their possible implications for modern landscape architecture. This interest also extends to native planting schemes, having implemented place-based projects that implement indigenous planting such as Rewilding the American Meadow at New York's Rockefeller Center Plaza.

=== Notable projects ===
- Rockefeller Center Channel Gardens (2023)
- Dubai Central Business District Master Plan (2017)
- Bali UNESCO World Heritage Plan (2013–2014)

== Lo-TEK ==
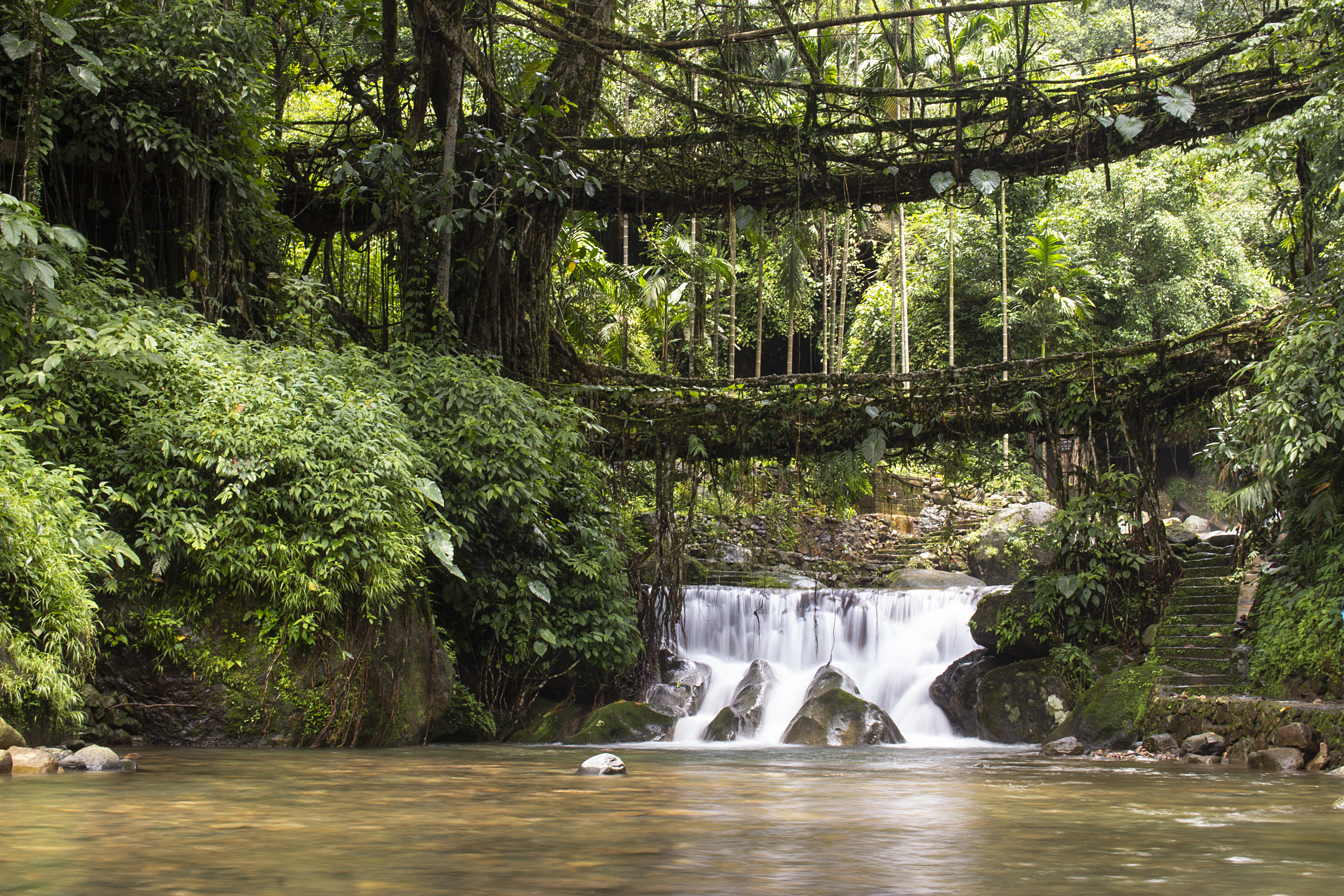
Living root bridges in Sohra

Lo-TEK: Design by Radical Indigenism, authored by Watson, is a compilation of indigenous land-based traditional ecological knowledge (TEK) from various groups around the globe. The information was gathered first-hand by Watson over seven years, and spotlights nature-based infrastructures such as the living root bridges of the Khasi people in India and the floating island homes of the Ma'dan in Iraq, made from qasab reeds. The book highlights TEK case studies from mountain landscapes, forests, deserts, and wetlands. The book has been featured in The New York Times, The Guardian, Dwell, Vogue, Architectural Digest, and The Washington Post.

In 2020, Watson presented a TED talk highlighting some of these case studies.

=== Awards ===
- AIGA 50 Books 50 Covers Winner, 2019
- ADC Annual Awards, Merit Honor, Publication Design, 2020
- Arnold W. Brunner Grant for Architectural Research, 2022
- Architecture + Design Independent Project Grant, 2022
- Arthur Ross Awards for Excellence in the Classical Tradition 2024
