= University of Virginia School of Architecture =

Architecture school of the University of Virginia

Coordinates: 38°2′19.9″N 78°30′14.2″W

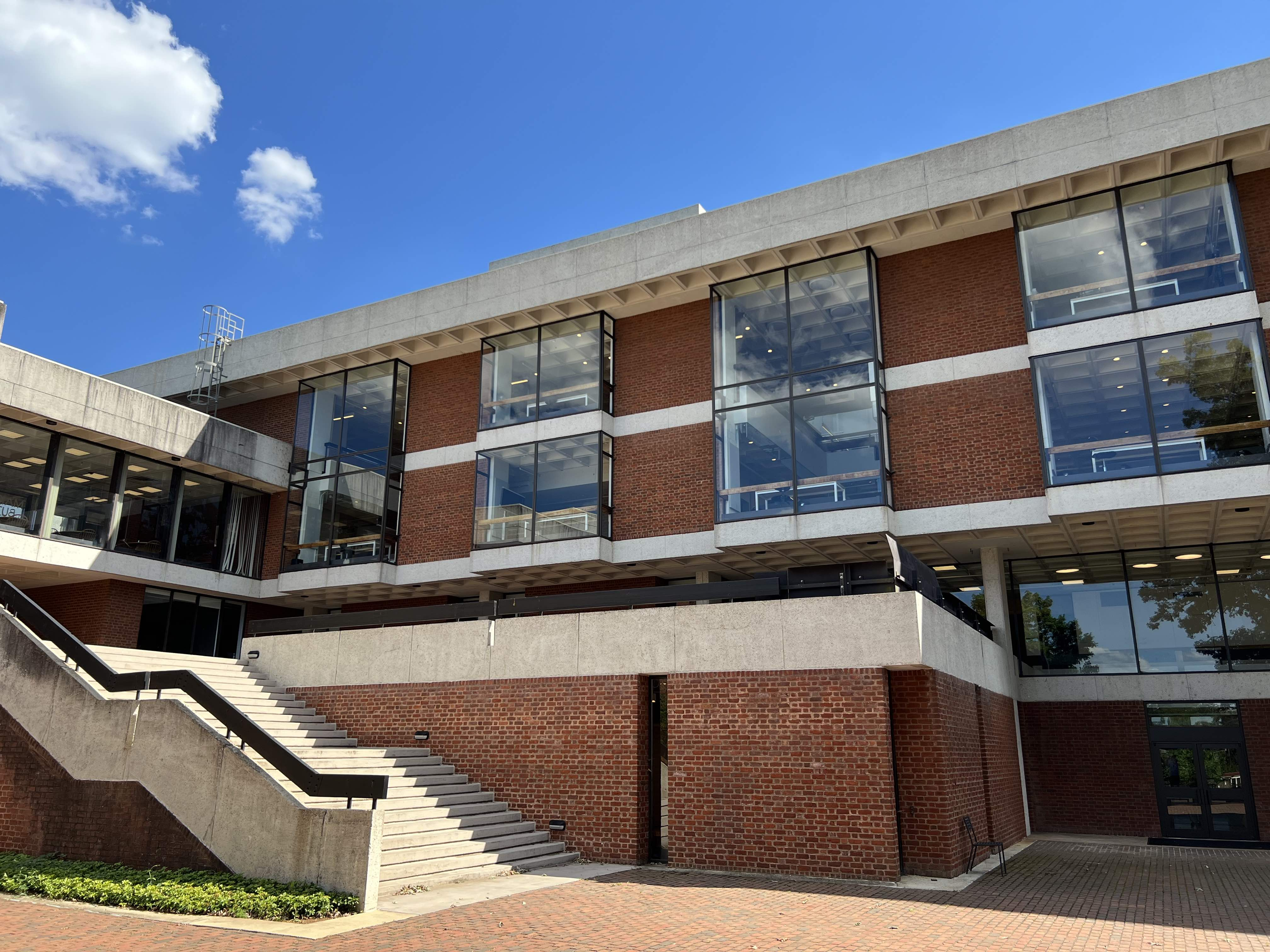
- Campbell Hall, the main building of the Architecture School
- Type: Public school of architecture
- Established: 1826 (school conceptualised); 1919 (school established)
- Parent institution: University of Virginia
- Dean: Malo André Hutson
- Faculty: 54 (full time)
- Students: 679; 392 (undergraduate)
- Location: Charlottesville, Virginia, U.S.
- Campus: Urban
- Website: www.arch.virginia.edu

The University of Virginia School of Architecture is the graduate school of architecture at the University of Virginia, a public research university in Charlottesville, Virginia. The school offers master's, doctoral and limited bachelor's programmes in architecture, landscape architecture, architectural history, and urban and environmental planning. Additionally, the school offers a certificate in historic preservation.

Founded by Thomas Jefferson, and set in the UNESCO World Heritage Academical Village, the school was founded in 1919, but the original vision for the school dated to 1826. To date, the school is considered a leader for architectural studies, and is ranked among the top ten schools of architecture in the United States.

== History ==
The School of Architecture was a cornerstone of founder Thomas Jefferson's concept for the university. He intended to use the architecture of the Academical Village as a didactic instrument for students. Evidence suggests that Jefferson planned to instruct architecture students himself, but he died in 1826 before his vision could be realized.

It would take more than 100 years after Jefferson's death for the School of Architecture to be formed. In 1919, a School of Fine Arts was established under the direction of Sidney Fiske Kimball, for whom the university's Fine Arts Library is named. In 1954 the university dissolved the School of Fine Arts, merging it into the College of Arts and Sciences, and creating a new School of Architecture.

In the nine decades since its founding, the school has grown from an initial enrollment of eleven students to some 350 undergraduate and 175 graduate students, with 54 full-time faculty members and an extensive staff.

== Facilities ==
The school is located in Campbell Hall, and includes studio space, lecture halls, classrooms, and the Fine Arts Café.

A decade-long program entitled "Campbell Constructions" was created by Dean Karen Van Lengen (1999–2009). She invited Architecture and Landscape Architecture faculty to contribute to the renovation and rejuvenation of the school and its grounds. Eleven projects were completed during this ten-year period, ranging from furniture to interior renovations, as well as building additions and outdoor projects and landscapes. Van Lengen led the planning and oversight of the designs.

This series of projects was also part of a larger redevelopment program at the university. The two building expansions and landscape designs were collaborative design efforts between the faculty offices and SMBW Architects, the "Architects of Record" for all of the major additions and landscape projects. These expansions added some 12,000 square feet (1,100 m^{2}) to accommodate the school's growth over the previous two decades. The South Addition, by faculty member Bill Sherman, provides office space along the south side of the building. A series of landscape interventions accompany the South Addition, designed by Warren Byrd (Nelson Byrd Woltz Landscape Architects). The Elmaleh East Wing, by faculty member W. G. Clark, provides additional space for reviews and exhibits. The new additions were dedicated in October 2008. The original building, by Pietro Belluschi, was completed in 1970.

== Rankings ==
In the 2012 rankings by the journal DesignIntelligence, the school's architecture program tied for first place among public Master of Architecture programs and ranked seventh overall. U.Va. is also the top program among public and private universities in the South. The program has been ranked the first or second public Master of Architecture program three times in the last 10 years, and in the top five publics of the last 10 years. The Master of Architecture program has the lowest tuition of any top-10 program ranked by DesignIntelligence's 2012 report.

The graduate landscape architecture program is ranked third in master's programs at public universities and fifth overall. In a survey of deans and administrators, U.Va.'s Master of Landscape Architecture program ranked third overall, second for research and theory, fourth in design communication and cross-disciplinary teamwork, and fifth in computer applications. The program has consistently remained in the top six of public programs and top 15 overall since 2005.

The Planetizen 2012 Guide to Graduate Urban Planning Programs ranked U.Va.'s program in Urban and Environmental Planning seventh in the nation.
