= Monchaux =

Monchaux or de Monchaux is a surname. Notable people with the surname include:

- Cathy de Monchaux (born 1960), British sculptor
- Henriette Delamarre de Monchaux (1854–1911), French naturalist and geologist
- Jan Monchaux (born 1978), French and German engineer
- John de Monchaux (1936–2018), Australian-American architect, city planner, and educator
- Nicholas de Monchaux (born 1973), designer and author
- Paul de Monchaux (born 1934), Canadian sculptor
