= MIT School of Architecture and Planning =

Architecture school at the Massachusetts Institute of Technology

Coordinates: 42.3593°N 71.09331°W

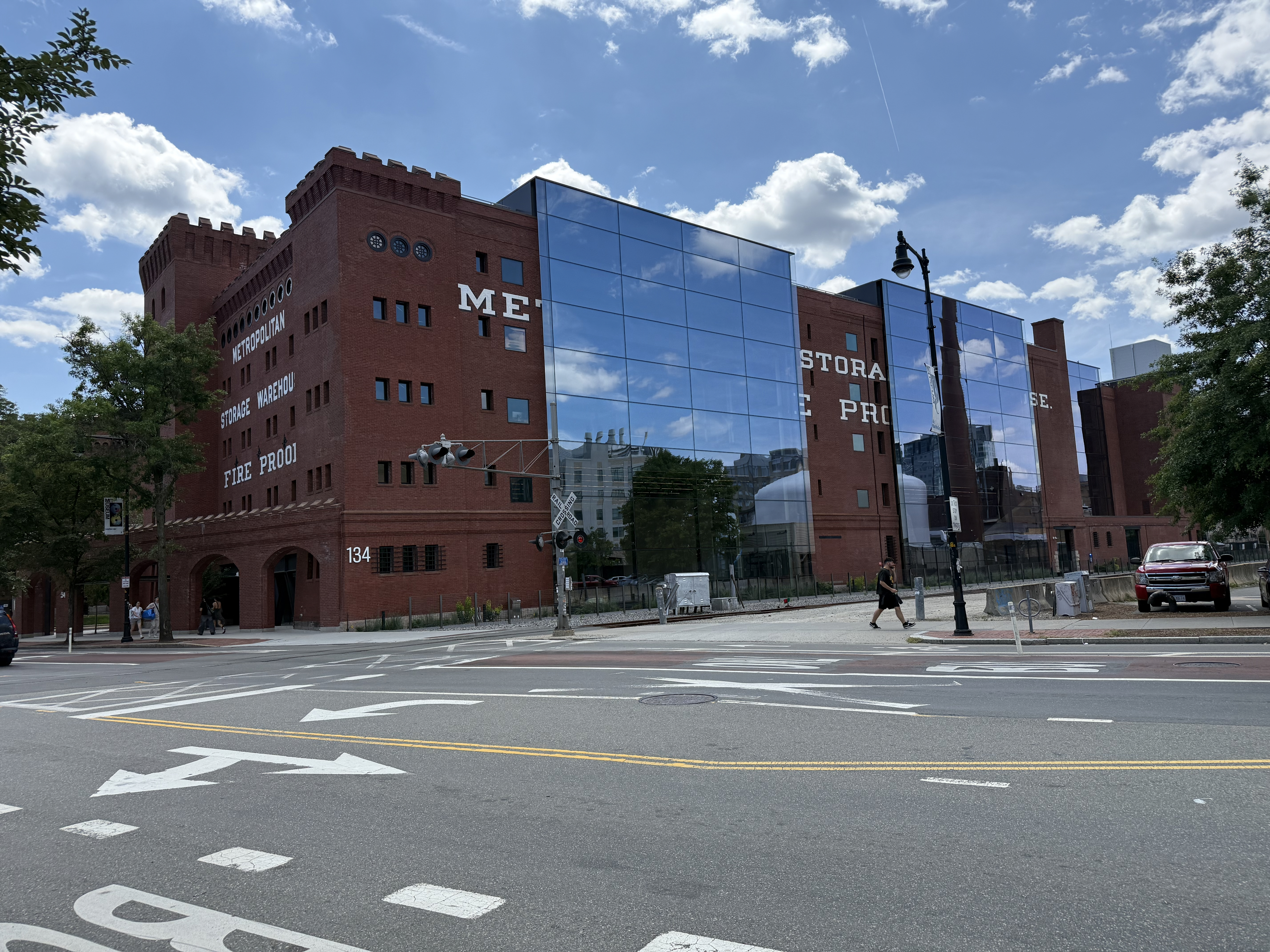
- Type: Private
- Established: 1868; 158 years ago (First courses taught); 1932; 94 years ago (MITSAP established)
- Affiliations: MIT
- Dean: Hashim Sarkis
- Faculty: 150
- Students: 408; 150 (Architecture); 56 (Urban Planning); 189 (Media Lab); 9 (Art, Culture and Technology)
- Location: Cambridge, Massachusetts, United States
- Campus: Urban
- Website: sap.mit.edu

The MIT School of Architecture and Planning (MIT SAP, stylized as SA+P) is one of the five schools of the Massachusetts Institute of Technology in Cambridge, Massachusetts. Founded in 1865 by William Robert Ware, the school offered the first architecture curriculum in the United States and was the first architecture program established within a university. MIT's Department of Architecture has consistently ranked among the top architecture/built environment schools in the world.

In the 20th century, the school came to be known by introducing modernism to America. MIT has a history of commissioning progressive buildings, many of which were designed by faculty or former students associated with the school. In recent years, the campus of the Massachusetts Institute of Technology has been expanded with a mix of modernist and post-modernist buildings. In August 2026, MIT opened a new home for the department in an extensively refurbished warehouse.

Since 2015, the Dean of Architecture and Planning is Hashim Sarkis.

== History ==
=== Department of Architecture (1865–) ===
The Architecture program at the Massachusetts Institute of Technology was founded in 1865, with the first courses taught in 1868. Despite its founding within a technical school, the architecture program began as a course of general study that was more closely aligned with the liberal arts. William Robert Ware modeled the school as a modified version of the École des Beaux-Arts in Paris, entrusting the program's design leadership to Eugene Letang, a French graduate of the École who was a strict teacher of precise draftsmanship and clear composition.

In 1932, when MIT President Karl T. Compton reorganized the institute's academic structure, the School of Architecture was formally established, incorporating the department of architecture. The head of the department of architecture, William Emerson, then proceeded to become the first dean of the School of Architecture.

When MIT completed its Cambridge campus in 1916, the Department of Architecture was the only program to remain in Boston, where it occupied MIT's original Rogers Building. In 1938, the new Rogers Building (Building 7) was completed, and the department joined the main campus.

=== Planning (1933–) ===
Urban Studies and Planning was originally a department within the School of Architecture at the Massachusetts Institute of Technology. The City Planning program was first offered in September 1933.

In 1944, the school was renamed as the ‘School of Architecture and Planning’.

In 1947, the Department of City and Regional Planning was established, which was renamed the Department of Urban Studies and Planning (DUSP) in 1969.

=== Media Lab ===
The MIT Media Lab was organized in 1985 by Professor Nicholas Negroponte and Jerome Wiesner, the former MIT President and Science Advisor to President John F. Kennedy. The Media Lab grew out of the work of MIT's Architecture Machine Group and remains within MIT's School of Architecture and Planning.

Devoted to research projects at the convergence of multimedia and technology, the Media Lab was widely popularized in the 1990s by business and technology publications such as Wired and Red Herring for a series of innovative but practical inventions in the fields of wireless networks, field sensing, web browsers, and the World Wide Web. The Media Lab works primarily on the theory and real-world implementation of physical-virtual interface. As Negroponte envisioned it, interface has become an architectural problem. There have been numerous research spinoffs of the Media Lab, including One Laptop per Child (OLPC), Electronic Ink, and LEGO Mindstorms.

=== Visual Arts ===
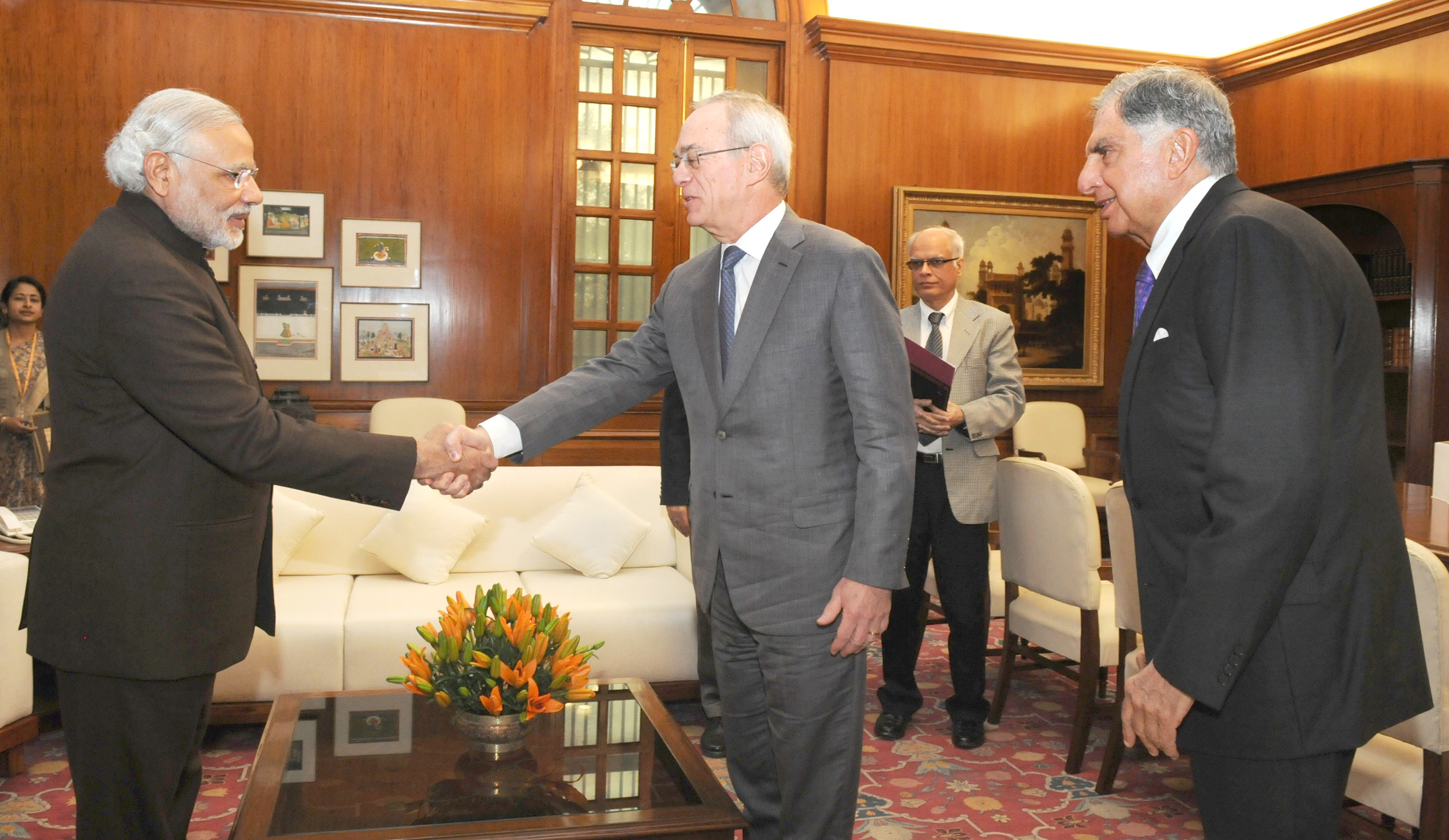
The President of the Massachusetts Institute of Technology (MIT), Cambridge, Dr. Rafael Reif calling on the Prime Minister, Shri Narendra Modi, in New Delhi on January 28, 2016. Shri Ratan Tata is also pictured.

The MIT Program in Art, Culture and Technology (ACT), hosted by the department of architecture, was created in the summer of 2009 by the merger of the Visual Arts Program (VAP) and the Center for Advanced Visual Studies (CAVS). The CAVS, now renamed the ACT Fellows program, was founded in 1968 with György Kepes as the director. The CAVS had the goal of encouraging collaboration among artists, scientists, and engineers, and it served as a precursor to the MIT Media Lab decades later. The successor ACT Fellows program continues as a research center for practicing artists.

=== Center for Real Estate ===
The MIT Center for Real Estate was established in 1983, with the aim of improving the quality of the built environment. An intensive one-year program leads to a Master of Science in Real Estate degree.

=== Deans of MIT School of Architecture and Planning ===
Dean	Tenure	Career
William Emerson	1932-1939	Architect
Walter R. MacCornack	1939-1944	Architect
William W. Wurster	1944-1950	Architect
Pietro Belluschi	1950-1965	Architect
Lawrence B. Anderson	1965-1971	Architect
William L. Porter	1972-1981	Architect
John de Monchaux	1981-1992	Architect and Urban Planner
William J. Mitchell	1992-2003	Architect and Urban Designer
Adèle Naudé Santos	2004-2014	Architect
Mark Jarzombek	Interim dean, July – December 2014	Architectural Historian
Hashim Sarkis	2015–present	Architect and Urban Designer

== Academic and research programs ==
=== Undergraduate education ===
Undergraduates are admitted MIT-wide and are not expected to formally declare a major until the end of the freshman or sophomore year. All MIT undergraduates must satisfy the General Institute Requirements regardless of major, as well as more-specialized departmental requirements. SAP undergraduates normally are affiliated with the architecture department (Course 4) or the Department of Urban Studies and Planning (DUSP, Course 11 or 11-6). All MIT undergraduates may freely register for any course on a university-wide basis, including graduate-level courses, provided that they have satisfied any course prerequisites.

=== Architecture ===
The department of architecture is divided into five main research areas:

- Architectural Design
- Building Technology
- Design and Computation
- History, Theory and Criticism of Architecture and Art (for which MIT was the first to establish such a program)
- The Art, Culture and Technology program.

Further, there are three special research groups:

- Aga Khan Program for Islamic Architecture (in partnership with Harvard University)
- Center for Real Estate
- Special Interest Group in Urban Settlements

The department offers several degrees, including:

- Bachelor of Science in Art and Design (BSAD)
- Bachelor of Science (BS) as pre-professional, undergraduate degrees
- Master of Architecture (MArch)
- Master of Science in Architecture Studies (SMArchS) with a specialization in the school's five main research areas
  - Building Technology
  - Design
  - Computation
  - History and Theory of Architecture
  - Urbanism
- Master of Science in Building Technology (SMBT)
- Master of Science in Art, Culture and Technology (SMACT)
- Doctor of Philosophy in Architecture (PhD) degree with specialization in
  - Building Technology
  - Design and Computation
  - History and Theory of Architecture
  - History and Theory of Art

Nicholas de Monchaux has been the chair of the architecture department since 2020.

=== Media Laboratory ===
The MIT Media Lab Program in Media Arts and Sciences (MAS) offers two degrees:

- Master of Science
- Doctor of Philosophy in Media Arts and Sciences

=== Urban Studies and Planning ===
The Department of Urban Studies and Planning (DUSP) was established in 1933 and has four specialization areas: City Design and Development; Environmental Policy; Housing, Community and Economic Development; and the International Development Group. There are also three cross-cutting areas of study: Transportation Planning and Policy; Urban Information Systems (UIS); and Regional Planning.

The Department of Urban Studies and Planning offers the following degrees:

- Master in City Planning (MCP)
- PhD in Urban and Regional Studies
- PhD in Urban and Regional Planning
- Bachelor of Science (SB) in Planning
- Bachelor of Science (SB) in Bachelor of Urban Science and Planning with Computer Science
- a five-year SB/MCP
- minors in Public Policy and in Urban Studies and Planning.

=== Center for Real Estate ===
The MIT Center for Real Estate was established in 1983 with the aim of improving the quality of the built environment. An intensive one-year program leads to a Master of Science in Real Estate degree.

=== Morningside Academy for Design ===
The MIT Morningside Academy for Design (MIT MAD) was established in 2022 as an interdisciplinary center to foster academic and research programs across MIT, especially between the School of Architecture and Planning and the MIT School of Engineering.

== Financial support ==
A substantial portion of the annual budget, which supports half tuition and full-tuition scholarships in addition to the school's costs, is generated through donations from alumni in both the public and the private sector. Students also have the opportunity to be fully-funded when traveling abroad through MISTI.

== Rankings ==
For four consecutive years from 2015 to 2018, the MIT Architecture Department received the top world ranking from QS World University Rankings. In the 2019/2020 rankings, the department was ranked 2nd in the world. In the 2020/2021 rankings, MIT regained the top position once again.

In 2018, Design Intelligence ranked MIT among the top three Most Admired Architecture Schools at the graduate level.

As of 2017, MIT's Department of Urban Studies and Planning ranks #1 in North America for graduate programs in urban planning, according to Planetizen.

== Research, projects and partnerships ==
In addition to its degree programs, MIT administers research initiatives in design, technology, history, and structure. The school publishes the annual peer-reviewed journals Thresholds and Building Discourse, and other design books and studio works.

=== MIT@Lawrence ===
MIT@Lawrence is a partnership among MIT, several Lawrence, Massachusetts-based community organizations, and the City of Lawrence. The partnership is aimed at facilitating affordable housing development, building community assets, and improving youth pathways to advancement. It is funded by the United States Department of Housing and Urban Development (HUD).

=== MIT Senseable City Lab ===
The MIT Senseable City Laboratory aims to investigate and anticipate how digital technologies are changing the way people live and their implications at the urban scale. Director Carlo Ratti founded the Senseable City Lab in 2004 within the City Design and Development group at the Department of Urban Studies and Planning, as well as in collaboration with the MIT Media Lab. Recent projects include "The Copenhagen Wheel" which debuted at the 2009 United Nations Climate Change Conference, "Trash_Track" shown at the Architectural League of New York and the Seattle Public Library, "New York Talk Exchange" featured in the Museum of Modern Art, and Real Time Rome included in the 2006 Venice Biennale of Architecture.

== Campus ==
Uncommon to design education, MIT's programs are integrated with the greater university in curriculum, resources, and campus. The network of contiguous buildings that combine to create the campus fosters sharing of common spaces and circulations with neighboring fields of study.

=== Rogers Building ===
As of August 2026, the department is moving to the newly repurposed Metropolitan Storage Warehouse, across Massachusetts Avenue from the Rogers Building. Previously most of the school facilities were located in or near the Rogers Building at the main entrance to the central MIT campus (chiefly designed by William Welles Bosworth); the hallway spaces have been nicknamed the Infinite Corridor. The fourth floor western end of the Infinite Corridor is lined with studio spaces and classrooms, while other classrooms are dispersed throughout the campus. The "glass bowl" nature of many of the architectural spaces lining the Infinite Corridor invites colleagues across the school for observation and collaboration.

Venues along the Infinite Corridor display exhibits that regularly feature the work of faculty, researchers, and students. Additional SAP exhibits may be seen at the MIT Museum, Wolk Gallery, Keller Gallery, Deans Office Gallery, Rotch Library, and the PLAZmA Digital Gallery.

=== Rotch Library ===
Originally built in 1938 as part of the Rogers Building (designed by William Welles Bosworth with Harry J. Carlson), MIT's Rotch Library of Architecture and Planning is one of the premier architecture libraries in the United States, supporting the first formal architecture program in the country. Rotch Library is also home to the Aga Khan Documentation Center, the GIS Lab, the Visual Collection, and the Rotch Limited Access collections.

Although the library acquired an additional half-floor of space in the mid-1950s, the collection had outgrown its 9,200-square-foot (850 m^{2}) facility by the 1970s. The only available expansion space was a narrow vertical cavity next to the original library. Schwartz/Silver Architects decided to suspend newly-added floors from roof girders which support the weight of the books from above, allowing the elimination of floor beams to maximize use of the narrow footprint. Six new floors were fitted into the same height as the four of the original building, while still allowing for a 17-foot (5.2 m) vertical clearance for a truck turnaround below. A narrow, sky-lit atrium between the old building and the new addition allows sunlight to reach offices and studios in the upper floors, mitigating the unavoidable loss of exterior views. The result is an addition that has been referred to as a "glass cage," which contains the book stacks, limited-access collection, and exhibition gallery, while the renovated original Bosworth building holds the main reading room and administrative offices.

=== Fab Labs ===
MIT SAP has access to multiple fab labs, including two along the Infinite Corridor, a woodshop in Building N51 (several blocks away), the Media Lab shop (in Building E14), the Design Center Lab, and other spaces. There is a smartphone app to allow students and staff to locate resources campus-wide and to coordinate access to fab facilities.

=== Media Lab buildings ===
At the eastern end of the campus, the Wiesner building (E15, designed by I. M. Pei) mainly houses the Media Lab programs, the List Visual Arts Center, the School of Architecture and Planning's Program in Art, Culture and Technology (ACT), and MIT's Program in Comparative Media Studies (CMS).

In 2009, the Media Lab expanded into a new building (E14) designed by Pritzker Prize-winning Japanese architect Fumihiko Maki. The local architect of record is Leers Weinzapfel Associates of Boston. The 163,000-square-foot (15,100 m^{2}), six-story building features an open, atelier-style, adaptable architecture specifically designed to provide the flexibility to respond to emerging research priorities. High levels of transparency throughout the building's interior make ongoing research visible, encouraging connections and collaboration among researchers. The two buildings are closely interconnected on several levels, allowing free movement between interior spaces.

=== Metropolitan Storage Warehouse ===
For decades, the huge, mostly windowless Metropolitan Storage Warehouse ("The Met", MIT Building W41) has stood at the bustling corner of Massachusetts Avenue and Vassar Street, the next intersection north of the main street entrance to MIT. Opened in 1895 and expanded until 1923, the historic building was purchased by MIT in 1972, where it remained a facility offering secure indoors storage space to individuals and organizations.

In the 1990s, MIT considered plans to use the building to house the MIT Museum, which instead was relocated to a new building in Kendall Square. Next, conversion to a dormitory for undergraduate students was considered, but was rejected because of difficulties in getting enough sunlight and fresh air to each room. In 2018, a plan was announced to convert the building to house the headquarters of the SA+P, classrooms, studios, a theater, galleries, and makerspaces. Diller Scofidio + Renfro and Leers Weinzapfel Associates were appointed collaborating architects for the project, taking on the challenge of converting the labyrinthine, cramped storage spaces. Inspired by the artworks of Gordon Matta-Clark, they proposed multiple cuts into the sturdy structure, introducing light and air to the dark interior.

In addition to SA+P, the renovated building will accommodate the Department of Urban Studies and Planning (DUSP), the Center for Real Estate, the Leventhal Center for Advanced Urbanism, Project Manus, and the Morningside Academy for Design (MIT MAD). The extensive renovations were scheduled to complete by mid-2026. The facility opened on August 12, 2026.

== Distinguished alumni and faculty ==
=== Notable alumni ===
- Christopher Alexander, architect, co-author of A Pattern Language
- Christopher Benninger, architect, urban planner, and founder of School of Planning, CEPT University, Ahmedabad
- William Welles Bosworth, architect and planner of the Campus of the Massachusetts Institute of Technology
- Gordon Bunshaft, partner in Skidmore, Owings and Merrill, modernist architect, Pritzker Prize laureate (1988)
- Idit Harel Caperton, educational psychologist and epistemologist
- Ogden Codman Jr., architect and interior decorator
- Charles Correa, architect, Japan Praemium Imperiale, RIBA Royal Gold Medal
- Daniel Chester French, architect of the Lincoln Memorial
- John Desmond, architecture professor at Louisiana State University
- Mantle Fielding, architect, art historian and tennis player
- Benjamin Fry, co-creator of Processing computer language
- Cass Gilbert, architect of the United States Supreme Court Building
- Marion Mahony Griffin, co-designer of the plan for Canberra, Australia
- Saul Griffith, inventor, recipient of MacArthur Award
- K. Michael Hays, architecture theorist
- Nathanael Herreshoff, naval architect/engineer, yacht designer
- Raymond Hood, architect of Rockefeller Center
- Myron Hunt, architect of landmarks in Southern California and Evanston, Illinois
- Mark Jarzombek, architecture historian
- Mitchell Joachim, professor and urban designer
- Janet Keeping, lawyer and academic, leader of the Green Party of Alberta
- Vincent G. Kling, architect, co-founder of KlingStubbins
- Piotr Kowalski, Polish sculptor
- Kevin A. Lynch, urban planner, professor and author
- John Maeda, president of Rhode Island School of Design (2008-2013), graphic designer, computer scientist, author
- Steve Meretzky, computer game designer
- Kathleen Merrigan, United States Deputy Secretary of Agriculture
- Benjamin Netanyahu, 9th and 13th Prime Minister of Israel
- Nicholas Negroponte, architect, technologist, founder of Media Lab, Chairman of One Laptop per Child
- Ngozi Okonjo-Iweala, Managing Director of the World Bank
- Dale Owen, Welsh architect
- William Pedersen of Kohn Pedersen Fox, American architect
- I. M. Pei, architect, RIBA Royal Gold Medal, Pritzker Prize Laureate (1983)
- Carlo Ratti, Italian architect, engineer, Director of MIT Senseable City Lab
- William Rawn, architect of Seiji Ozawa Hall
- Casey Reas, co-creator of Processing computer language
- Mitchel Resnick, professor of learning research
- Douglas T. Ross, scientist who coined the term CAD for computer-aided design
- Arthur Rotch, American architect and activist
- Steve Russell, creator of Spacewar!, the first videogame
- Alexis Sablone, American professional skateboarder and artist
- Frederick P. Salvucci, former secretary of MassDOT, influential mass transit and "Big Dig" transportation planner
- B. Stanley Simmons, American architect
- Louis Skidmore, founding partner of Skidmore, Owings and Merrill, AIA Gold Medal
- Michael Sorkin, American architect
- Edward Durell Stone, modernist architect
- Louis Sullivan, leader of Chicago School, recipient of AIA Gold Medal
- Tomas Taveira, Portuguese architect
- James Knox Taylor, supervisory architect of Denver Mint and Philadelphia Mint
- Robert Taylor, architect, founding faculty member at the Tuskegee Institute
- Nader Tehrani, Dean of Cooper Union
- Stanley Tigerman, architect
- John Tsang, Financial Secretary (Hong Kong), Chair of the MC6 of the WTO
- Harry Mohr Weese, architect, historic preservation advocate
- Sarah Whiting, dean of Harvard Graduate School of Design, former dean of Rice School of Architecture
- Harry Wolf, American architect

=== Current faculty ===
- Azra Aksamija, artist and architecture historian
- Yung Ho Chang, former chair of Department of Architecture
- Marcelo Coelho, computing artist and designer
- Nicholas de Monchaux, current Head, Department of Architecture
- Mark Jarzombek, architecture historian and theorist
- Sheila Kennedy, architect
- Kent Larson, director of the changing places research group
- Nicholas Negroponte, cofounder MIT Media Lab
- John Ochsendorf, structural engineer, recipient of MacArthur Award
- Adèle Naudé Santos, architect and urban designer
- Hashim Sarkis, Dean
- Wang Shu, Pritzker Prize laureate
- Anne Whiston Spirn, landscape architect
- George Stiny, design and computing theorist
- Skylar Tibbits, designer and computer scientist

=== Former faculty ===
- Alvar Aalto, Finnish architect, recipient of AIA Gold Medal and RIBA Royal Gold Medal
- Charles Abrams, urbanist, housing expert and founder of New York City's Housing and Development Administration
- Alan A. Altshuler, educator and government official
- Pietro Belluschi, architect, former Dean, recipient of AIA Gold Medal and National Medal of Arts
- Muriel Cooper, influential graphic designer, first female tenured professor at MIT Media Lab, first art director of the MIT Press
- William Emerson, former Dean of Architecture
- Buckminster Fuller, visionary architect, designer, author, invented the geodesic dome
- Sigfried Giedion, author of the highly influential history Space, Time and Architecture
- Dolores Hayden, scholar of architecture, urbanism, and American studies
- K. Michael Hays, architecture historian
- Louis Kahn, architect, urban planner
- Bashirul Haq, architect, regional modernist, ex-professor at BUET and SUST
- Joi Ito, former director of MIT Media Lab
- Sanford Kwinter, writer and architecture theorist
- Kevin A. Lynch, urban planner, professor, author
- Winy Maas, Dutch architect, member of MVRDV
- John Maeda, President of the Rhode Island School of Design, graphic designer, author
- Rahul Mehrotra, founding principal of RMA Architects, dean of Harvard Graduate School of Design
- William J. Mitchell, former Dean, architect and urban designer who played a major role in MIT campus expansion
- Neri Oxman, bioengineer, designer
- Kenzo Tange, architect, AIA Gold Medal, Pritzker Prize laureate (1987)
- Nader Tehrani, Dean, Cooper Union
- William Robert Ware, founder of architecture programs at MIT and Columbia University
- Krzysztof Wodiczko, artist
- William Wurster, former Dean, recipient of AIA Gold Medal, founder of architecture program at UC Berkeley
- Meejin Yoon, former Chair of the Department of Architecture, recipient of the Rome Prize, now Dean of the College of Architecture, Art and Planning at Cornell University

== See also ==
- Campus of the Massachusetts Institute of Technology
