= John de Monchaux =

City planner and academic (1936–2018)

Jean Pierre de Monchaux (August 29, 1936 – April 30, 2018), known as John de Monchaux, was an Australian-American architect, city planner, and educator.

== Life and career ==
Born in Dublin, Ireland, to Australian parents, de Monchaux attended Gimnasio Moderno in Bogotá and Stuyvesant High School in New York City before studying architecture at St. John's College, University of Sydney.

After practicing in Sydney as an architect, de Monchaux obtained his Master's in Urban Design at the Harvard GSD in 1961. Beginning in 1963, de Monchaux taught at the Bartlett School of Architecture in London and worked for the Professor of Urban Design there, Richard Llewellyn Davies. With Llewellyn Davies and Walter Bor as partners-in-charge at Llewellyn Davies Weeks Forestier-Walker and Bor, de Monchaux was the head of the design team for the Plan for Milton Keynes, Buckinghamshire, published in 1970.

De Monchaux moved with his wife, sociologist and member of the Milton Keynes team, Suzanne Beauchamp de Monchaux, to New York in 1970 to found the American office of Llewellyn Davies, undertaking work in Watts, Detroit, and Chicago. In 1972, he was part of the Harvard GSD's second class of Loeb Fellows. de Monchaux returned to his native Australia in 1974 to found what would become one of Llewellyn-Davies' successor firms, Kinhill, undertaking work in Southeast Asia and Australia.

In 1981 he moved back to the United States to become Professor and Dean of the School of Architecture and Planning at MIT. His accomplishments as Dean included the founding of the Media Lab in 1985, whose name he helped devise, and the construction of the Rotch Library from 1988 to 1991. In 1992, he stepped down as Dean and served as General Manager of the Aga Khan Trust for Culture, returning to MIT as a Professor from 1996 until his retirement in 2009.

De Monchaux is the brother of sculptor Paul de Monchaux, the uncle of sculptor Cathy de Monchaux, and the father of designer and author Nicholas de Monchaux and critic Thomas de Monchaux.
