= Makr Shakr =

Italian company that makes a robotic bartender product

Makr Shakr (pronounced Maker Shaker) is a producer of robotic bartenders and baristas based in Turin, Italy. The robots receive orders from customers via mobile devices, and leverage automation technologies to prepare different beverages.

== Research and development ==
Development for Makr Shakr's robotic bartenders began at MIT Senseable City Lab led by professor Carlo Ratti, with the support of the Coca-Cola and Bacardi. It originated from the concept to leverage digital technologies to "explores the new dynamics of social creation and consumption".

The prototype is equipped with the ability to perform motions essential to bartending like shaking, muddling and slicing. In addition, cocktail-making is "crowdsourced" through a mobile app inviting individual users to contribute their own recipes. Its movement is modelled after the choreography by New York Theatre Ballet's Marco Pelle.

Makr Shakr was first introduced to the public through various international technology and design events. After a test run in April 2013 during the Milan Design Week, three mechanical arms were deployed at the Google I/O Conference in San Francisco a month later.

In 2014, Makr Shakr received design awards by Core 77 and D&AD for its concept and digital interface respectively.

== Commercial launch ==
Makr Shakr was launched commercially as a start-up in 2017, with an assembly line set up in Turin, Italy. It partners with the German automative system manufacturer KUKA in producing the robotic bartenders.

Operating at a rate of 60-90 seconds per drink, the brand's various models are implemented in cities such as Amsterdam, Prague, London and Las Vegas. The Bionic Bar, produced by Makr Shakr, is installed in nine cruise ships of cruise line Royal Caribbean. The company is set to debut in Changi Airport, Singapore, Bali, Olympia, Wa and Dallas in 2024.

The company's flagship robot Toni featured in the exhibition "AI: More Than Human" at the Barbican, London in 2019.

== Influence on restaurants and bars ==
As the COVID-19 pandemic drastically affected the food and beverage business, Makr Shakr was credited in media as one of the robotic devices that have offered solutions to alleviate the difficult situation faced by the industry, from reducing human contact and the possibility to spread the virus, to providing relief for the shortage of manpower.

In late 2019, the brand initiated the pilot of a stipend program in the US, in collaboration with SUNY Erie Community College, New York. With the sale of every robotic unit, the company offered parts of the proceeds to a selected individual whose livelihood had been affected by automation to acquire a new professional skill. The first stipend recipient was sponsored to study in the Brewery Science and Service Program.

== See also ==
- Automated restaurant
