= BMW Guggenheim Lab =

Collaboration between the Solomon R. Guggenheim Foundation and BMW

The BMW Guggenheim Lab was a collaboration between the Solomon R. Guggenheim Foundation and the BMW Group between 2011 and 2013. Part urban think tank, part community center and part gathering space, the interdisciplinary mobile laboratory explored issues of urban life through public programming and discourse.

An advisory committee chose the interdisciplinary team that operated the lab in each city. The lab was expected to travel to nine cities over the course of six years. In 2013, however, BMW ended its support after the lab had traveled to only three cities, New York, Berlin and Mumbai; the project ended in 2014 with an exhibition in New York.

== Concept, organization and structures ==
The concept behind the lab was developed by David van der Leer, assistant curator, architecture and urban studies, and Maria Nicanor, assistant curator, architecture, of the Solomon R. Guggenheim Museum. The lab's advisory committee was composed of internationally renowned experts in a range of fields and nominated members for each city's lab team, an interdisciplinary group that helped to create the programming for that location.

Three different structures were intended to house the lab over the life of the project, each of which could be moved and was intended to travel to three cities. Only one structure was built, however, designed by the Tokyo-based architecture firm Atelier Bow-Wow. Seoul-based graphic designers Sulki & Min created the graphic identity for the project, including an interactive logo that changed over the course of the project.

The lab's three-city cycle was designed around the theme Confronting Comfort, which explored ways of making urban environments more responsive to people's needs, striking a balance between individual and collective comfort, and promoting environmental and social responsibility. The program was designed to proactively engage residents from each city and participants on the Internet and from around the world, in free programs and experiments, and it addressed ideas and issues of particular relevance to each city. The Advisory Committee members were Daniel Barenboim, Elizabeth Diller, Nicholas Humphrey, Muchadeyi Masunda, Enrique Peñalosa, Juliet Schor, Rirkrit Tiravanija and Wang Shi.

== New York City ==
The lab was open from August 3 to October 16, 2011, in New York City's East Village, and was attended by over 54,000 visitors from 60 countries. Members of the New York Lab Team were Omar Freilla, founder and coordinator of Green Worker Cooperatives, Bronx, New York; Charles Montgomery, Canadian journalist and urban experimentalist; Olatunbosun Obayomi, Nigerian microbiologist and inventor; and architects and urbanists Elma van Boxel and Kristian Koreman, founders of Zones Urbaines Sensibles, Rotterdam.

== Berlin ==
From June 15 to July 29, 2012, the lab was open in Pfefferberg, a complex of galleries and artist studios in Prenzlauer Berg, Berlin. Members of the Berlin Lab were José Gómez-Márquez, program director for the Innovations in International Health Initiative (IIH) at the Massachusetts Institute of Technology (MIT); Italian architect and engineer Carlo Ratti, who directs the MIT Senseable City Lab; Berlin-based artist Corinne Rose, who works with photography and video and teaches at the Bern University of the Arts, Switzerland; and Rachel Smith, principal transport planner with AECOM, based in Brisbane. The programming of the Berlin Lab focused on four main topics: Empowerment Technologies (Gómez-Márquez), Dynamic Connections (Smith), Urban Micro-Lens (Rose) and the Senseable City (Ratti).

== Mumbai ==
The lab opened in Mumbai, India on December 9, 2012 and ran until January 20, 2013. The central location was on the grounds of the Dr. Bhau Daji Lad Museum in Mumbai’s Byculla neighborhood, with additional satellite locations around the city. The lab's team consisted of Aisha Dasgupta, a British demographer based in Malawi; Neville Mars, a Dutch architect based in China; Trupti Amritwar Vaitla, an architect and urban transport designer from Mumbai; and Héctor Zamora, a Mexican artist based in Brazil. Along with neighborhood-specific public programming, the Mumbai Lab program included participatory research studies and design projects, including a competition to redesign Mumbai's Kala Nagar Junction.

== Final exhibition ==
The program concluded with an exhibition, Participatory City: 100 Urban Trends from the BMW Guggenheim Lab, which was on view at the New York museum from October 2013 through January 5, 2014. The exhibition featured photos and videos from the Lab's public programs and displayed 100 terms representing the "most-talked about words" during the Lab's activities in New York, Berlin and Mumbai.
