= David Karp =

American web developer and entrepreneur (born 1986)

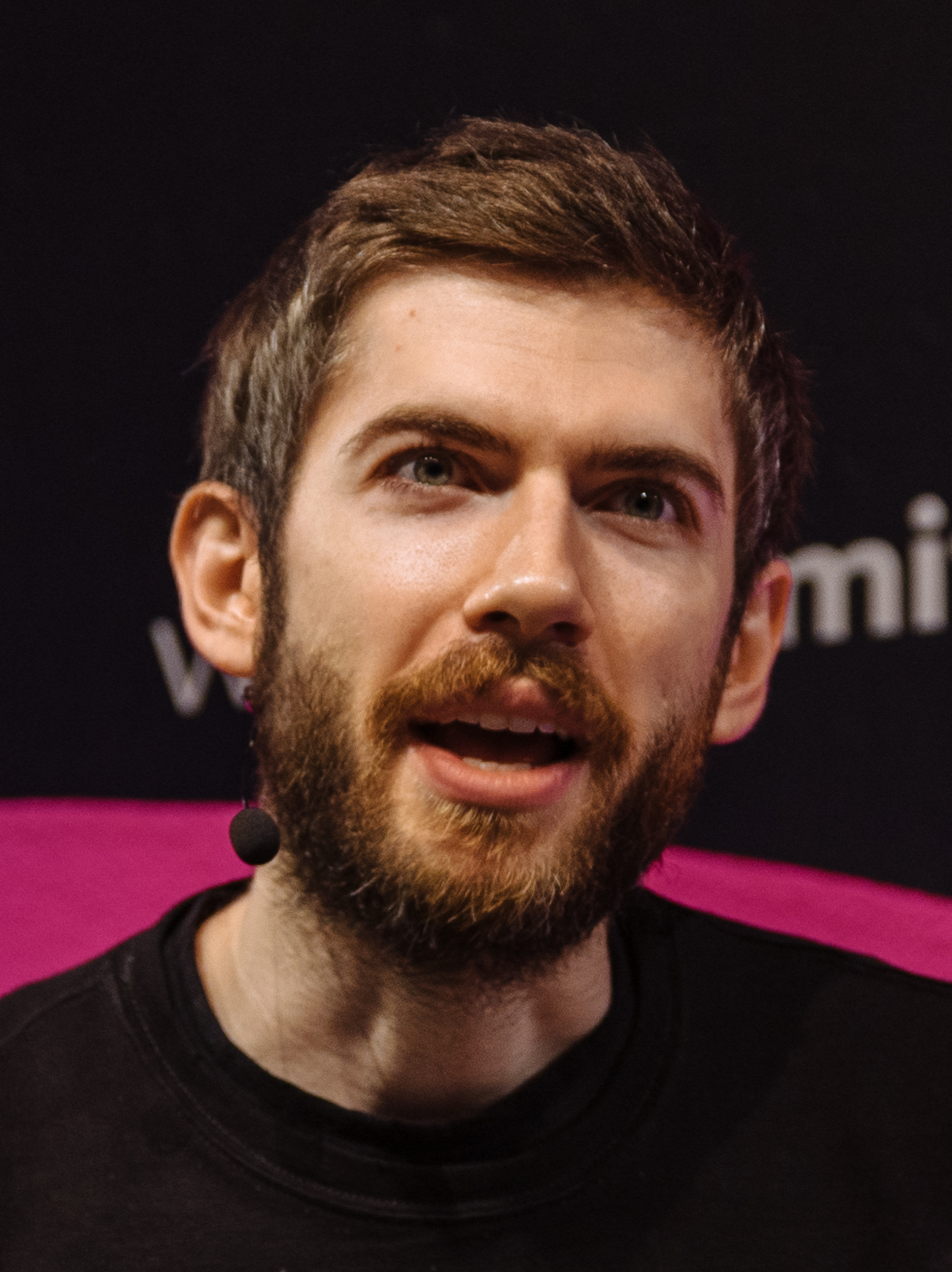
- Karp in 2017
- Born: July 6, 1986 (age 40); New York City, U.S.
- Years active: 1995–present
- Known for: Founder and CEO of Tumblr
- Website: www.davidslog.com

David Karp (born July 6, 1986) is an American businessperson, best known as the founder and former CEO of the microblogging platform Tumblr.

Karp began his career, without receiving a high school diploma, as an intern under Fred Seibert at the animation company Frederator Studios, where he built the studio's first blogging platform and conceived, wrote, and edited their first internet video network, Channel Frederator. Karp went on to work for the online parenting forum UrbanBaby until it was sold to CNET in 2006. Karp then started his own software consulting company, Davidville, where he worked with software engineer Marco Arment on projects for clients. During a gap between contracts in 2006, the two began work on a microblogging website, which was launched as Tumblr in February 2007. As of November 1, 2017, Tumblr hosts over 375.4 million blogs. In August 2009, Karp was named Best Young Tech Entrepreneur 2009 by BusinessWeek and in 2010, he was named to the MIT Technology Review TR35 as one of the top 35 innovators in the world under the age of 35.

On May 20, 2013, it was announced that Yahoo! and Tumblr had reached an agreement for Yahoo! to acquire Tumblr for $1.1 billion. Karp remained CEO of the company. Karp announced in November 2017 that he would be leaving Tumblr by the end of the year.

== Early life ==
Born in New York City, Karp grew up on the Upper West Side of Manhattan. His parents are Barbara Ackerman, a science teacher from San Anselmo, California, and Michael D. Karp, a film and television composer. He has a younger brother named Kevin. His parents separated when he was 17. Karp attended the Calhoun School from pre-school through eighth grade, where his mother teaches science. In 1997, he began learning HTML and began designing websites for businesses. Karp attended Irvine High School and then went on to attend the Bronx High School of Science before dropping out in 2001 and started homeschooling. At the time, Karp had aspirations of attending college in New York, or going to MIT and saw homeschooling and doing other projects on the side as a way to impress the colleges. Karp never returned to high school or earned his high school diploma.

== Career ==
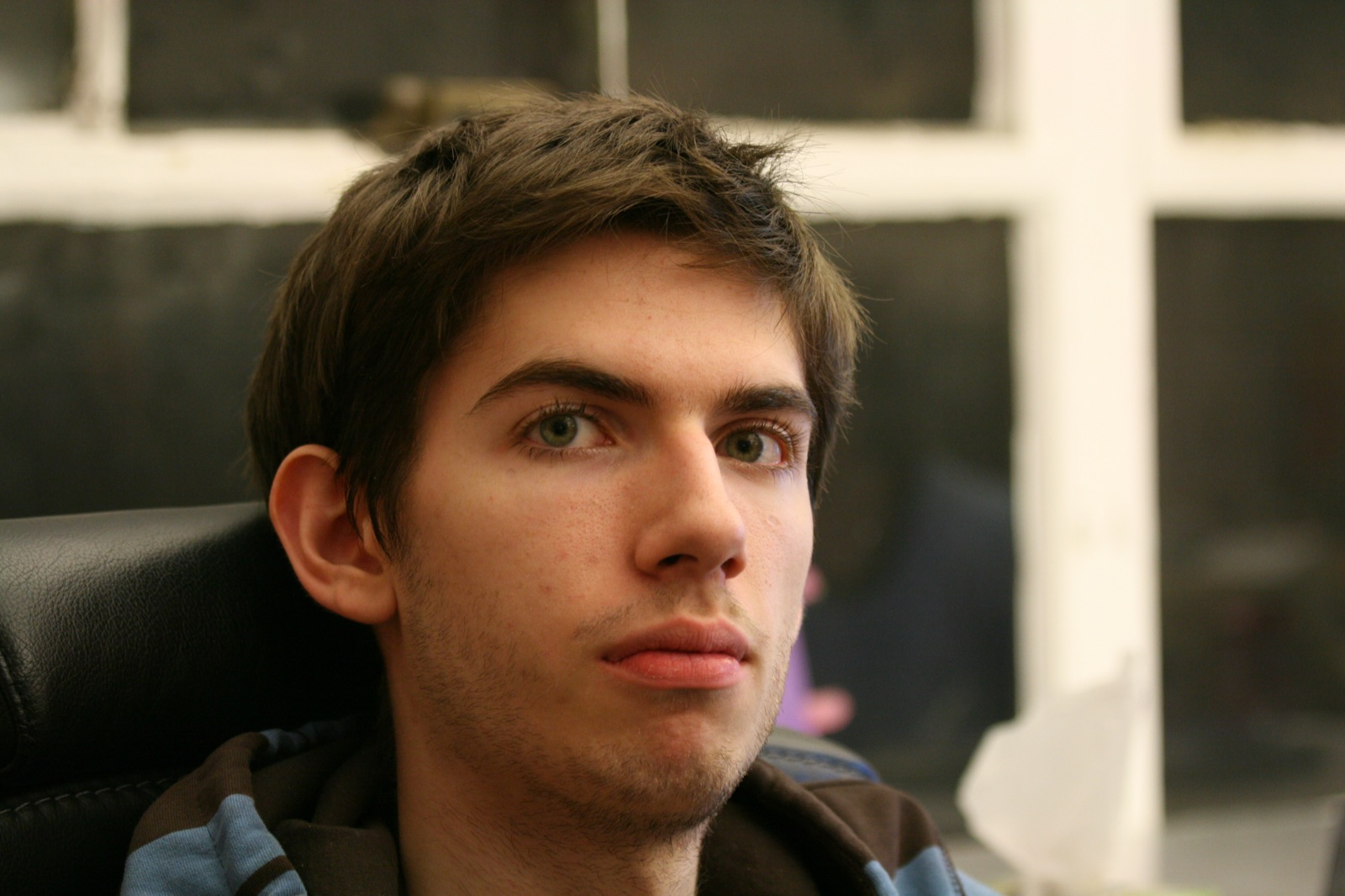
Karp in 2007

Karp began as an intern in 2000 for animation producer Fred Seibert, founder of Frederator Studios. Karp's mother had taught Seibert's children at the Calhoun School and was friends with his wife. Karp was fascinated with the work of Frederator's computer engineers and his visits became regular. After he started homeschooling, Karp also began taking Japanese classes at the Japan Society and saw a math tutor, with whom he worked on writing software for winning at blackjack and poker. When entrepreneur John Maloney sought technical help with UrbanBaby, an online parenting forum, a Frederator employee recommended Karp for the job. Karp completed the project, which had to be done in a couple of days, within four hours. Maloney made him UrbanBaby's head of product and gave him a small amount of equity. In 2003, while still working for UrbanBaby, Karp moved alone to Tokyo for five months.

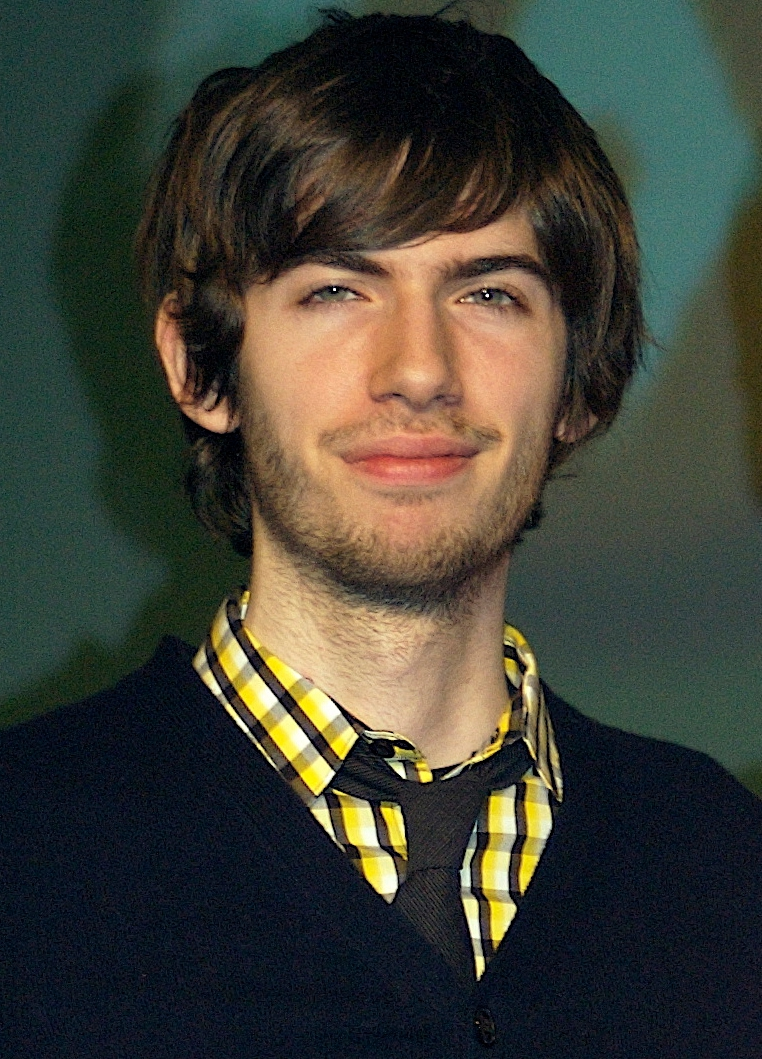
Karp in 2009

Karp left UrbanBaby after it was sold to CNET in 2006. Using money from the sale of his shares, Karp started his own software consultancy company, Davidville, functioning as a mix of client work and production of Karp's own products and services. Marco Arment joined the company as an engineer after replying to Karp's Craigslist ad. Karp had been interested in microblogging for some time and was waiting for one of the established blogging platforms to introduce their own microblogging platform. After a year of waiting, Karp and Arment began working on their own microblogging platform during a two-week gap between contracts in 2006. Tumblr was launched in February 2007 and within two weeks, the service had gained 75,000 users.

In October 2007, Karp shut down his consultancy business as his work with Tumblr was interfering with his client work. Davidville was renamed Tumblr, Inc. and 25 percent of the company was sold to a small group of investors.

On May 20, 2013, it was announced that Yahoo! and Tumblr had reached an agreement for Yahoo! to acquire Tumblr for $1.1 billion. As of November 1, 2017, Tumblr hosts over 375.4 million blogs. Karp announced in November 2017 that he would be leaving Tumblr by the end of the year.

Karp has made personal investments into several companies including Superpedestrian, Inc., Sherpaa, Inc., and Splash.

== Personal life ==
Karp joined the Planned Parenthood Board of Directors in 2014. In March 2017, Tumblr and Planned Parenthood launched an initiative calling on the tech industry to support Planned Parenthood.

Karp endorsed Hillary Clinton for president in the lead-up to the 2016 United States election. He also donated $11,200,000 to Mark Kelly in his 2020 special election campaign for U.S. Senate, making him the campaign's top individual donor.
