= Mark Jarzombek =

American art historian

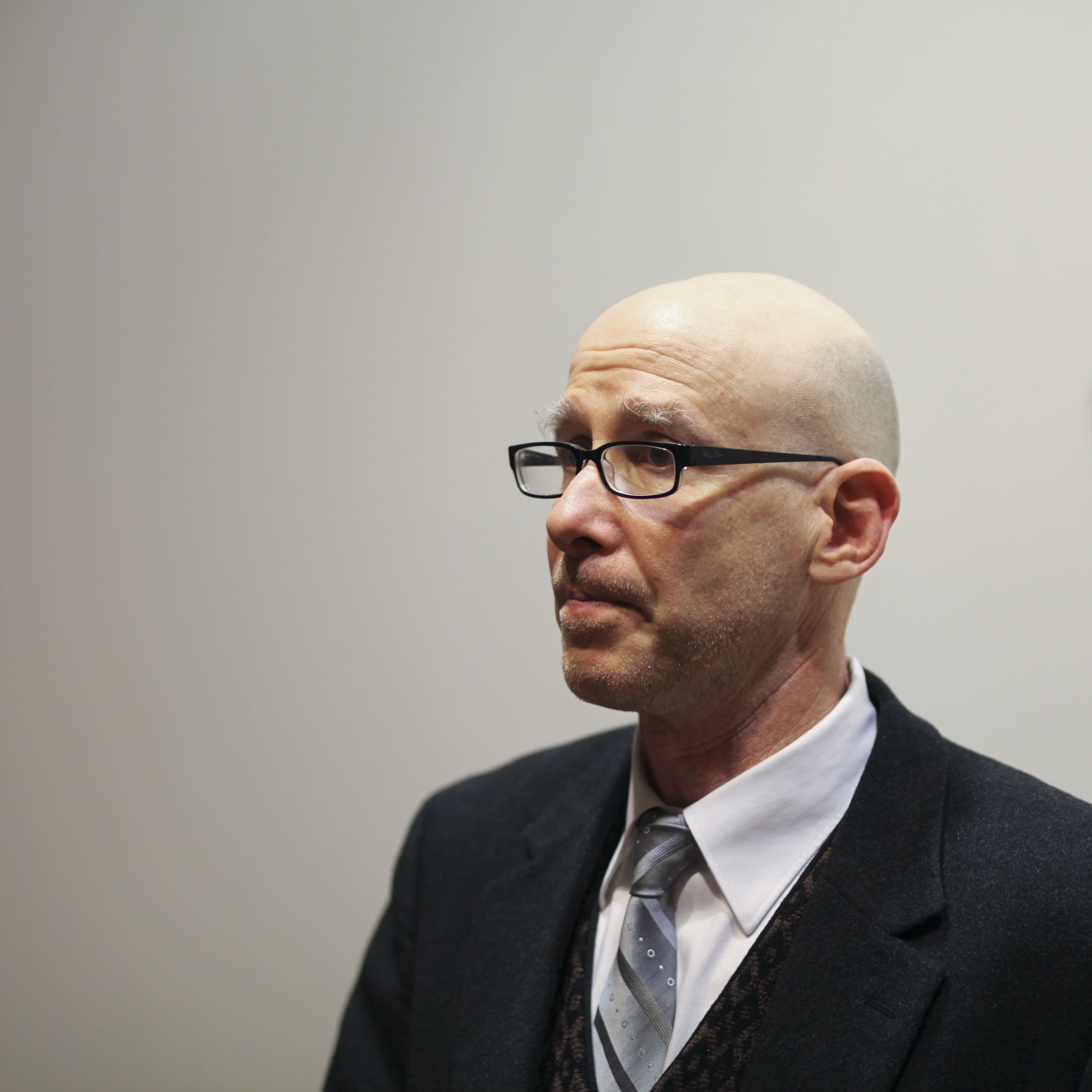
- Born: 1954 (age 71–72); United States
- Citizenship: United States of America
- Education: ETH Zurich
- Occupation: Architectural historian
- Years active: 1995-present
- Organization: Massachusetts Institute of Technology
- Notable work: The Long Millennium: Affluence, Architecture and the Making of Modern Society (Routledge, 2024); Architecture Constructed: Notes on a Discipline (Bloomsbury, 2023); A House Deconstructed (Actar Press, 2023)
- Awards: Fulbright Senior Specialist Award (2009); Society of Architectural Historians Fellow (2026)
- Website: Academic profile

Mark Jarzombek (born 1954) is a United States-born architectural historian, author and critic. Since 1995 he has taught and served within the History Theory Criticism Section of the Department of Architecture at MIT School of Architecture and Planning, Cambridge, Massachusetts, United States.

== Career ==
He gained a PhD in the History of Architecture from Massachusetts Institute of Technology in 1986. He was Director of History, Theory, and Criticism of Architecture and Art, Department of Architecture, MIT, (1996-2007). Associate Dean, School of Architecture and Planning, MIT (2007 – 2014), and Interim Dean, School of Architecture and Planning, MIT (2014 - 2015). From 1987 to 1994, he taught at Cornell University.

== Books ==
=== Digital Stockholm Syndrome in the Post-Ontological Age ===
Digital Stockholm Syndrome in the Post-Ontological Age (2016) examines the relationship between contemporary post-humanist or in-humanist theory and the discourses that promote digital technologies and data-centric practices. Jarzombek situates both domains within a broader intellectual context that questions traditional conceptions of the human and that draws on ideas associated with the ontological turn. Jarzombek hypothesizes that this convergence has produced a shared commitment to an ontologically diminished human subject and has encouraged the rise of what Jarzombek characterizes as a new mode of being formed within an algorithmic and computational milieu.

The book proposes that ubiquitous digital systems have reshaped understandings of self-hood by converting individual activity into continuous data streams. He refers to these streams as an individual’s “ontic exhaust,” a term intended to describe the traces generated by routine digital interaction. In this account, practices such as commercial data collection, algorithmic modelling, and global positioning give rise to an environment in which data about the individual becomes indistinguishable from the individual as such. Jarzombek connects this development to what he calls an “animated ontology,” in which distinctions between subject and object weaken under conditions of pervasive computational mediation.

He contends that constant location tracking, satellite navigation, and mobile connectivity shape a form of self-hood he calls the “being-global.” This form of being is defined by a worldwide system that records and redistributes digital traces. The resulting conditions, he argues, influence both popular and scholarly approaches to ontology and contribute to the adoption of computational methods across the humanities.

=== A House Deconstructed ===
A House Deconstructed is a 2023 book by Mark Jarzombek and Vikramaditya Prakash that examines the environmental, economic, and social systems embedded in the construction of a single house in Seattle. The book is based on a three-year study by the Office for Uncertainty Research. It is inked to the group’s Many Houses, Many Worlds installation at the 2021 Venice Biennale. The book presents the house as a product of global material and labour networks rather than a self-contained object.

=== Architecture Constructed: Notes on a Discipline ===
Architecture Constructed: Notes on a Discipline draws on Jacques Derrida’s grammatology. The book positions the theoretical invisibility of the tektōn as integral to understanding architecture as a discipline rather than as a domain defined solely by the interpretive authority of archē. It presents a non-linear account of the often undervalued role of the tektōn. The book argues that architecture continues to be structured by unresolved tensions between conceptual authority and practical making, similar to the historical relationship between theory and practice.

=== A Global History of Architecture ===
Jarzombek co-authored A Global History of Architecture (2007) with Francis D. K. Ching and Vikramaditya Prakash. The book organizes material into time slices beginning in 3500 BCE. It emphasizes architecture as a cultural production.

=== Selected publications ===
- On Leon Battista Alberti, His Literary and Aesthetic Theories (MIT Press, 1989)
- The Psychologizing of Modernity: Art, Architecture and History (Cambridge University Press, 2000).
- Designing MIT: Bosworth's New Tech (Boston: Northeastern University Press, October 2004).
- Urban Heterology: Dresden and the Dialectics of Post-Traumatic History (Lund University, 2001)
- The Post-traumatic Turn and the Art of Walid Raad and Krzysztof Wodiczko: from Theory to Trope and Beyond, in Trauma and Visuality, Lisa Saltzman and Eric Rosenberg, editors (University Press of New England, 2006)
- A Global History of Architecture, 3rd edition (New York: Wiley & Sons, 2017)
- Architecture of First Societies: A Global Perspective (New York: Wiley & Sons, 2014)
- The Long Millennium: Affluence, Architecture and its Dark Matter Economy
- Architecture Constructed: Notes on a Discipline
- A House Deconstructed (Actar Press, 2023)
- The Data-Human: Who are We? Exploring the Questions of our Identity in the Digital Age
- Digital Stockholm Syndrome in the Post-Ontological Age

== Recognition ==
- 2016: Andrew W. Mellon Foundation for GAHTC ($1.5 million)
- 2019: Andrew W. Mellon Foundation for GAHTC ($1 million)
- 2026: Society of Architectural Historians fellowship.
