= Berkeley Center for New Media =

Program at UC Berkeley

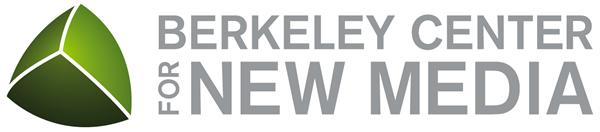
BCNM logo

The Berkeley Center for New Media (BCNM) is a research, teaching, and public events program at UC Berkeley. Its mission is to critically analyze and help shape developments in new media from cross-disciplinary and global perspectives that emphasize humanities and the public interest. Founded in 2004 by Linda Williams, Ken Goldberg, Greg Niemeyer, Whitney Davis, and Cathy Koshland, the organization seeks to study new media from three disciplinary perspectives, the humanities, the arts, and technology. BCNM awards Designated Emphasis Degrees in New Media and Masters Certificates to graduate students and Undergraduate Certificates to undergraduate students at UC Berkeley.

BCNM's spaces are shared between Sutardja Dai Hall and the Moffitt Undergraduate Library.

The BCNM aims to analyze the opportunities and risks associated with new media, and to consider how they can benefit education, political engagement, privacy, and aesthetic experience.

The BCNM presents courses, symposia and special events for students, researchers, industry, and the public to seek out, consider, and develop innovative theories of contemporary new media. It offers a special program for UC Berkeley PhD students and has established new cross-disciplinary faculty positions.

== Programs ==
- As of 2025, the Berkeley Center for New Media had a certificate program on the global internet infrastructure. The program is interdisciplinary, examining the "technical, economic, legal, environmental, and social dimensions" of digital infrastructures.

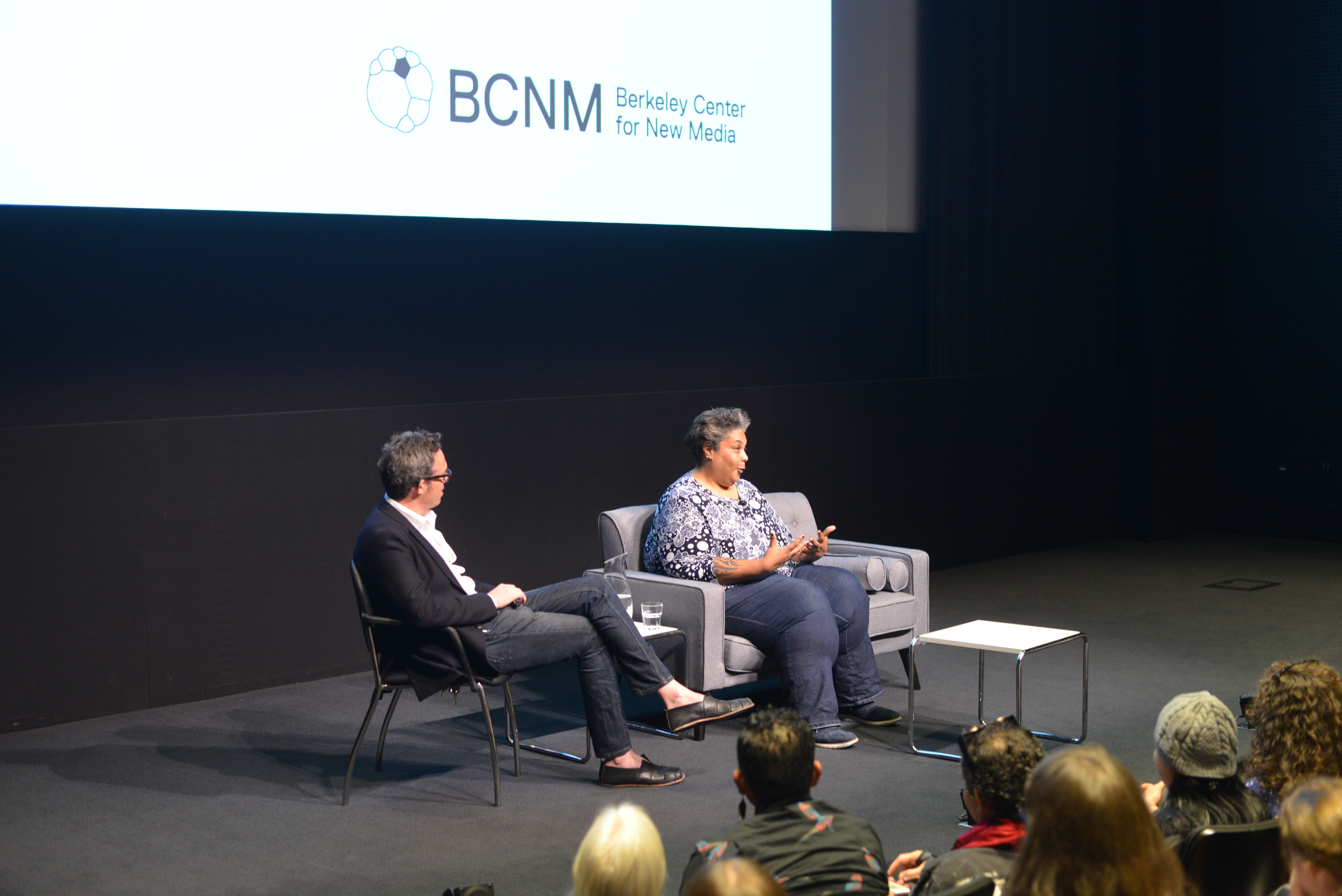
American writer Roxane Gay at a 2018 ATC lecture for the Berkeley Center for New Media on 10 September 2018

- The Art, Technology, and Culture Colloquium is a forum for presenting new ideas that challenge conventional wisdom about technology and culture. BCNM frequently hosts the ATC Lecture Series. This series, free of charge and open to the public, presents artists, writers, curators, and scholars who consider contemporary issues at the intersection of aesthetic expression, emerging technologies, and cultural history, from a critical perspective.
- The History and Theory of New Media lecture series brings to campus leading humanities scholars working on issues of media transition and technological emergence. The series promotes new, interdisciplinary approaches to questions about the uses, meanings, causes, and effects of rapid or dramatic shifts in techno-infrastructure, information management, and forms of mediated expression. Presented by the Berkeley Center for New Media, these events are free and open to the public.
- The Commons Conversations: Technology and Public Life in Changing Times series is a discussion series on the impact of new media on our current political and public climate.
- Design Futures lecture series has been discontinued

== Notable faculty ==
- Nicholas de Monchaux: BCNM Director and Associate Professor of Architecture and Urban Design
- Ken Goldberg, co-founder of BCNM
- Abigail De Kosnik

== Notable alumni ==
- Trevor Paglen: PhD in Geography - notable space artist

== See also ==
- Howison Lectures
- Tarski Lectures
