= UrbanBaby =

Internet forum

UrbanBaby was a New York-based Internet forum devoted to anonymous discussion of urban motherhood founded in August 1999 by Susan and John Maloney. It shut down on July 6, 2020.

The site gained attention by many parents across major cities but mostly in New York.

The site was later bought by CNET.

The site had employed David Karp as a software consultant before he went on to found Tumblr using his earnings from (and experience gained during) his time at UrbanBaby.

Ardent debates on the site included the merits of suburban vs urban living, the appropriateness of paying $700 for a stroller, the proper age at which to begin leaving babies with a babysitter, and whether it was bad parenting to leave a sleeping baby in an apartment to dash down to the laundry room.

The site proved to be a rich source of sociological information about New York City upper class lifestyles. As an example, some women reported receiving a "push present" from their husbands after giving birth.

When the site was redesigned in 2008, some users were upset. A new site that was similar to the old interface was developed at YouBeMom.com.

The demise of the site was seen as a sign that the Internet was not changing motherhood for the better, as had been hoped, but instead, that resources for mothers were still woefully limited.

A similar site, Dcurbanmom.com, was the subject of a Brookings Institution study which examined more than 400,000 messages on the forum that discussed schools in the Washington, D.C. area. The study found that parents tended to talk about the school’s academic and extracurricular offerings when discussing more affluent schools, and were more likely to discuss the families who attended lower-income schools, rather than the academic offerings at those schools. The study concluded that privileged parents had a tendency to choose segregation.

A similar site in Japan is the Yomiuri Shimbun's Hatsugen Komachi.
