= William Emerson (American architect) =

American architect and MIT dean (1873–1957)

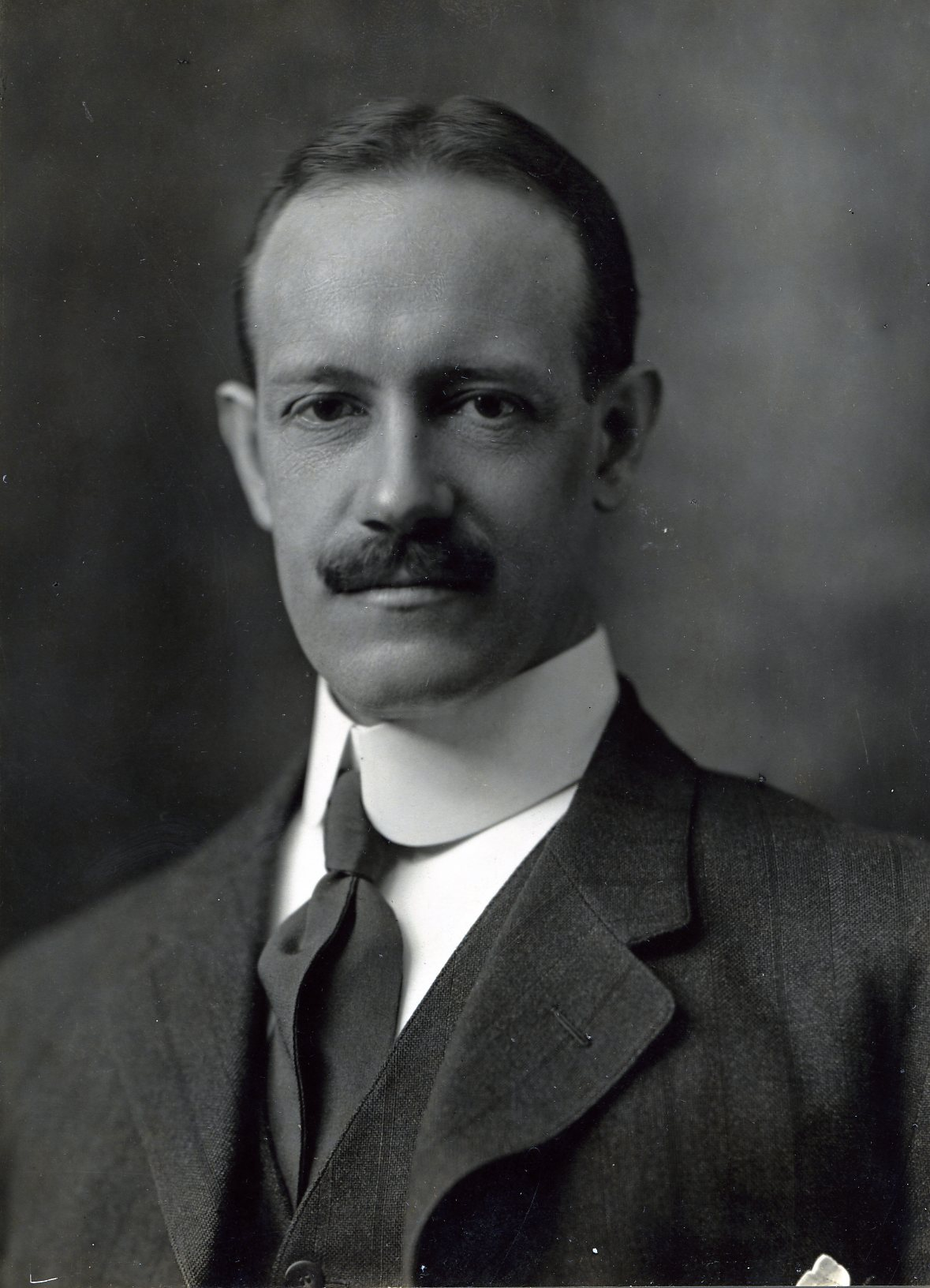
- William Emerson c. 1920
- Born: October 16, 1873; New York City, US
- Died: May 4, 1957 (aged 83); Cambridge, Massachusetts, US
- Education: Harvard College; Columbia University; École des Beaux-Arts
- Occupations: Architect, professor
- Employer: Massachusetts Institute of Technology

William Emerson (October 16, 1873 – May 4, 1957) was an American architect and the first dean of the MIT School of Architecture from 1932 to 1939. He was instrumental in establishing a city planning department at MIT.

== Biography ==
Emerson was born in New York City. His parents, of English and Dutch descent, were Susan Tompkins and John Haven Emerson, a medical doctor. His father's family included poet and essayist Ralph Waldo Emerson, the young Emerson's great uncle.

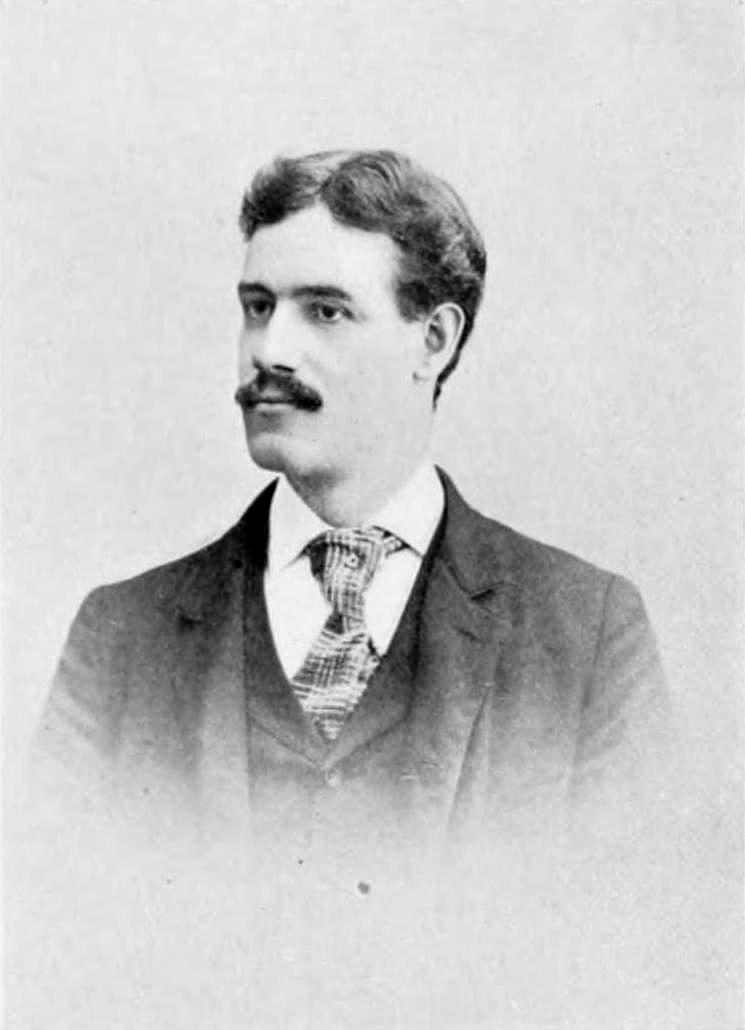
Emerson in his student years

Emerson graduated from Harvard College in 1895, where he was a Harvard Crimson editor and Hasty Pudding Club comedian. He completed architectural training at Columbia University and the École des Beaux-Arts in Paris. He began his practice in 1899 in New York, focusing on social housing and bank buildings. At the end of World War I, Emerson returned to Paris for two years as director of the Bureau of Construction of the American Red Cross.

In 1919, Emerson returned to the United States and took a faculty appointment at the Massachusetts Institute of Technology in Cambridge, Massachusetts. In 1932 he became the dean of the newly formed School of Architecture. In his first year, he oversaw the creation of a Department of City Planning, commissioning planner Thomas Adams to create its curriculum. In conjunction with the planning program, Emerson's seven-year deanship shifted the school from pure design practice to a broader focus on public policy and social issues. At MIT, his students included Robert Van Nice and I.M. Pei.

Emerson served as the chair of the Unitarian Service Committee in the 1940s and as Vice President of the Byzantine Institute of America. He died on May 4, 1957, in Cambridge.

Emerson married Frances White, and they resided at her grandfather's house on Brattle Street. She died shortly before him on March 10, 1957. They are buried in Sleepy Hollow Cemetery in Concord, Massachusetts.
