= Splash (website) =

Event management service

- Type: Private
- Founded: 2011
- Founders: Ben Hindman and Brett Boskoff
- Headquarters: New York, New York
- Services: Event management
- Owner: Ben Hindman and Brett Boskoff
- Website: splashthat.com

Splash is an online event management service. The service allows users to plan, promote, execute, and measure the success of their events, with a focus on streamlining event marketing execution.

Powered by One Clipboard, Splash launched in February 2012 in New York City by co-founders Ben Hindman and Brett Boskoff.

Splash entered into the ticketing market in January 2013. In 2013, Splash facilitated 200 South by Southwest events, the Google Glass Tour and Vevo's Halloween Costume Party.

In December 2016, the company raised $7 million in a Series B funding round led by Ascent Venture Partners, with participation from Spark Capital, Lerer Hippeau Ventures, ScaleUP Ventures, Tumblr founder David Karp, and Vine cofounder Rus Yusupov. The company also announced that they would be transitioning to focus on enterprise clients.

In 2021, Splash announced expanding their international footprint with a new regional headquarters in Amsterdam to serve EMEA Companies.
