= Carlo Ratti =

Italian architect, engineer, inventor, educator and activist

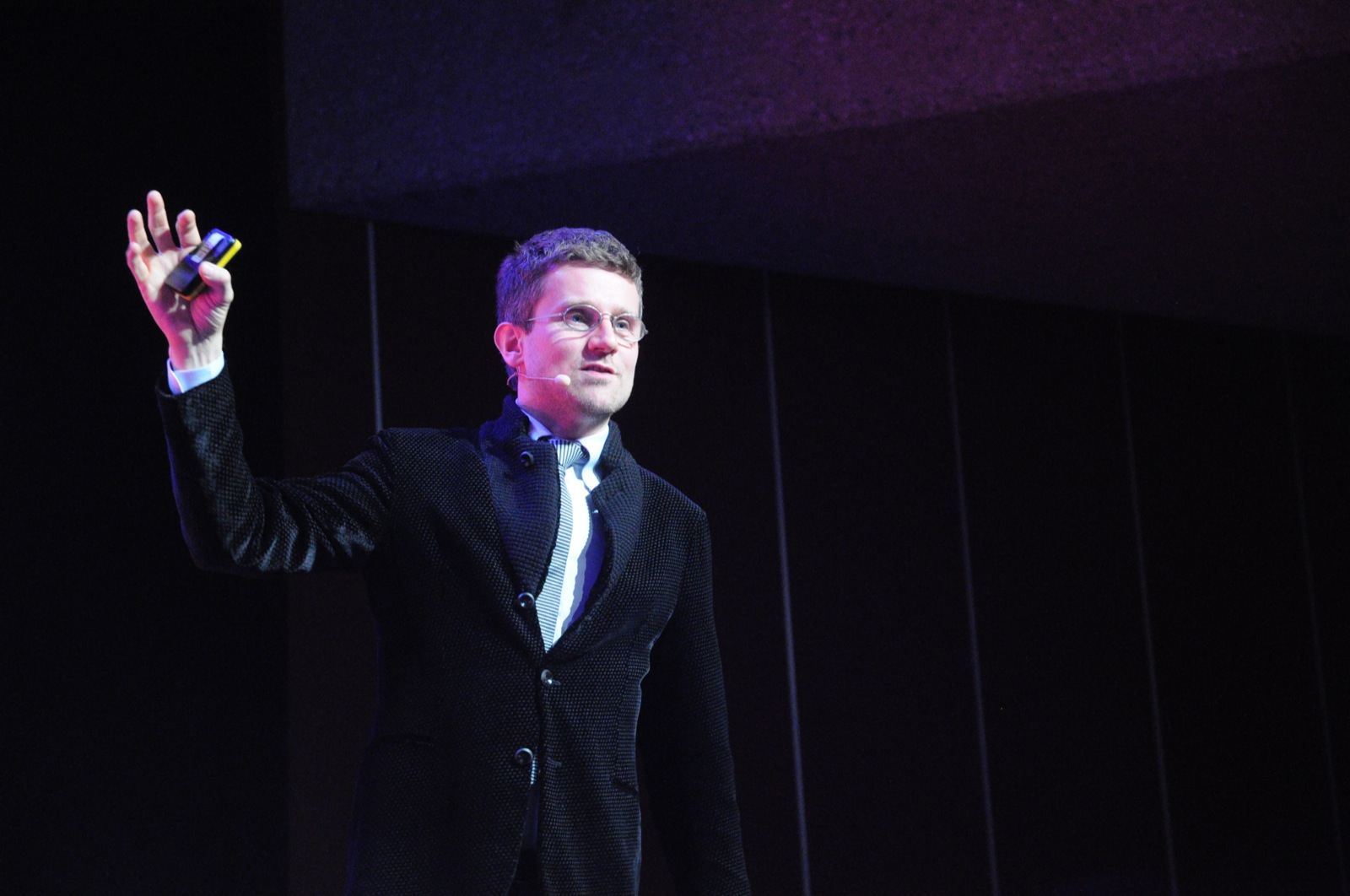
- Born: 1971 (age 54–55); Turin, Italy
- Occupations: Architect, engineer, MIT professor

Carlo Ratti (born 1971 in Turin, Italy) is an Italian architect, engineer, inventor and author. He is a Professor of the Practice at the Massachusetts Institute of Technology where he directs the MIT Senseable City Lab. Ratti is also a founding partner of CRA-Carlo Ratti Associati, an international design and innovation firm with locations in Turin, New York and London.

Additionally, he holds positions as Distinguished Professor in the Department of Architecture, Built Environment and Construction Engineering at the Politecnico di Milano and Honorary Professor at TTPU Tashkent.

Ratti was named one of the "50 most influential designers in America" by Fast Company and highlighted in Wired magazine's "Smart List". Forbes listed him as one of the "Names You Need To Know". In December 2023, Carlo Ratti was appointed by outgoing president Roberto Cicutto as curator of the 19th Venice Biennale of Architecture that opened in 2025.

== Education and early career ==
Carlo Ratti graduated from the École Nationale des Ponts et Chaussées in Paris, France, and the Politecnico di Torino in Italy. He earned his MPhil and PhD degrees from the Martin Centre at the University of Cambridge, UK.

In 2000, he moved to the Massachusetts Institute of Technology (MIT) as a Fulbright scholar, working with Hiroshi Ishii at the MIT Media Lab.

== Vision ==
In a 2011 TED talk in Long Beach, California, Ratti outlined a vision of an "architecture that senses and responds". He argued that digital technologies are becoming networked and atomised, changing the interaction between humans and the built environment, leading to a state where cities and objects "talk back to us".

In a discussion with architect Peter Cook as part of the Royal College of Art 2011/2012 Architecture Lecture Series, Ratti traced this vision back to the Baroque and Art Nouveau periods, as well as to Michelangelo's anecdotal "why don't you speak to me?" addressed to his statues.

Ratti's projects include the Copenhagen Wheel, developed at the MIT Senseable City Lab, which explored how any bicycle can be transformed into a network-connected e-bike by replacing the wheel hub. Other work includes "Trash Track", a project using electronic tracking to map and optimize waste flows through cities, and the establishment of a research centre in Singapore as part of an MIT-led initiative on the Future of Urban Mobility.

Ratti has also contributed to the discourse on smart cities. In an article published in Scientific American with Anthony M. Townsend, he contrasted the prevailing technocratic vision of smart cities with a more "human-centric" approach, emphasizing the potential of urban technologies to promote bottom-up social empowerment.

== Architecture and design ==
Ratti's designs inventively bridge the digital and the physical. The Digital Water Pavilion at the World Expo 2008 in Zaragoza, Spain developed by CRA, Ratti's design practice, reacts to visitors by having streams of water part to let them through. Its fluid architecture was considered by Time magazine as one of the "Best Inventions of the Year". In CRA's extension of the Trussardi fashion house in Milan's central in Piazza della Scala, developed with botanist Patrick Blanc, a green vertical canopy is suspended on a crystal box to promote new interactions with people on the inside and the outside. An un-built proposal for the 2012 Summer Olympics in London turns a landmark building into a "Cloud" of blinking interactive art.

Several design projects rely on data visualization. Real Time Rome, which filled an entire pavilion at the 2006 Venice Biennale of Architecture, explored real-time dynamics of a city mapped through cellphone data. New York Talk Exchange, exhibited at MoMA in New York City as part of the exhibition "Design and the Elastic Mind", moved further to explore global communication flows together with Saskia Sassen. Several projects from the MIT Senseable City Lab were included in Fast Company's "Best Infographics of 2011". A data analysis and visualisation project resulted in an Op-Ed in The New York Times to redesign the map of the United States.

During the 2013 Milan Design Week ("Salone del Mobile"), Ratti ventured into product design with a project for Italian furniture manufacturer Cassina, called "Our Universe". At the same venue, another project, called "Makr Shakr", explored The Third Industrial Revolution and its effect on creativity and design through the simple process of making a drink.

Ratti curated the "Future Food District" – one of the themed pavilions at Expo 2015 in Milan. In 2017, CRA was part of the team led by developer Lendlease, which won the international competition to transform the former area of Milan's Expo 2015 into a district focused on science and innovation (MIND-Milan Innovation District).

=== Milano Cortina 2026 Olympic and Paralympic Torches ===
In 2025, Ratti and his design firm, designed the torches for the Milano Cortina 2026 Winter Olympics and Paralympics, titled The Essential. The simple design emphasizes transparency, sustainability and Italian craftsmanship.

Featuring an open-frame structure that reveals the internal flame mechanism, the torches are constructed from recycled aluminum and a brass alloy, with an iridescent finish achieved through Physical Vapor Deposition (PVD). Two color variants distinguish the events: Shades of Sky for the Olympic Games and Mountains of Light for the Paralympic Games. The grip is made of XL EXTRALIGHT®, a bio-based polymer derived from renewable sources.

Each torch is engineered for reuse and can be refueled up to ten times, reducing the environmental footprint of the torch relay. The torches were unveiled at both the Triennale di Milano and the Italian Pavilion at Expo 2025 in Osaka. Some torches will be part of the collection of the Olympic Museum in Lausanne.

== Teaching and activism ==
Ratti has taught at the Politecnico di Torino, the Ecole Nationale des Ponts et Chaussees, Harvard University, Strelka Institute and MIT. The class "Urban Infoscape" taught at the Harvard Graduate School of Design in 2004 was central to setting the vision of the MIT Senseable City Lab. In 2011, Ratti was a curator for the Berlin location of the BMW Guggenheim Lab. He was also a program director at the Strelka Institute for Media, Architecture and Design in Moscow.

While a PhD student at the University of Cambridge, Ratti was one of the initiators of Progetto Collegium for the reform of Italian universities, together with philosophers Umberto Eco and Marco Santambrogio. The project led to the foundation of the Collegio di Milano and other institutions in Italy. Ratti has been involved in several civic initiatives, most notably to preserve Italy's industrial architecture heritage.

- In June 2007, the Italian Minister of Culture and Tourism Francesco Rutelli selected Ratti as a member of the Italian Design Council – an advisory board to the Italian government that includes 25 leaders of design in Italy.
- In 2009, Ratti worked on several civic initiatives in Brisbane, Australia, after being named Queensland's inaugural Innovator in Residence – a Queensland Government initiative that invites world-renowned thinkers to address local issues.
- Between 2015 and 2018, he served as Special Adviser on Urban Innovation to the President and Commissioners of the European Commission.
- Since 2009, he has been a delegate to the World Economic Forum in Davos and is currently co-chair of the Global Future Council on Cities and Urbanization.
- Since 2015, he has been a visiting professor at the Technical University of Munich (TUM) in the Department of Architecture, within the Fellowship Program of the TUM Institute for Advanced Study.

== Start-ups founded ==
Ratti is the founder of several start-ups in the United States and Europe.

Launched in 2014, Makr Shakr is a startup producing robotic bartending systems, whose products have been installed aboard Royal Caribbean cruise ships as well as in malls and hotels in the US, France, the UK, and Italy.

In 2018, Ratti contributed to the launch of Scribit, a company manufacturing a portable, wall-mounted drawing robot. In 2019, Scribit was named among Time magazine's Innovation of the Year.

== Scientific contributions and writing ==
Ratti has authored over 500 publications, including a book on Opensource Architecture together with Matthew Claudel for Italian publisher Einaudi (later published in English by Thames&Hudson) and the essay "The City of Tomorrow", co-written with Matthew Claudel for Yale University Press.

In a seminal paper in Environment and Planning B, Ratti questions the validity of the urban analysis technique Space Syntax. He has been opening the way in exploring the use of cellphone data to understand urban dynamics, which has now developed into an established field of scientific investigation. In general, the MIT Senseable City Lab works on papers that use network analysis and complexity science to better understand cities. Such aspects were discussed by Ratti in Seed magazine's Salon, together with mathematician Steven Strogatz.

Ratti often writes editorials and articles for international media. As well as being a contributor to Project Syndicate, he has written for Scientific American, The Architectural Review, La Stampa, BBC, The Huffington Post, The New York Times, Domus, Il Sole 24 Ore.

He appeared on BBC Radio 4's The Museum of Curiosity in November 2019. His hypothetical donation to this imaginary museum was "A bionic arm".

== Selected books ==
- Ratti, Carlo; Picon, Antoine (2023). Atlas of the Senseable City. Yale University Press. ISBN 978-0300247510.
- Ratti, Carlo; Claudel, Matthew (2016). The City of Tomorrow: Sensors, Networks, Hackers, and the Future of Urban Life. Yale University Press. ISBN 978-0300221138.
- Ratti, Carlo; Claudel, Matthew (2015). Open Source Architecture. London: Thames & Hudson. ISBN 9780500343067.
- Ratti, Carlo; Offenhuber, Dietmar (2014). Decoding the City: Urbanism in the Age of Big Data. Basel: Birkhäuser. ISBN 9783038213925.
- Ratti, Carlo (2014). Architettura Open Source: Verso una progettazione aperta (in Italian). Turin: Einaudi. ISBN 9788806214272.
- "Senseable City Guides". MIT Senseable City Lab. 2011–present.
