= Maria Nicanor =

Museum curator

Maria Nicanor is a Spanish-American museum curator specializing in design and history of architecture. She has held significant positions at the Victoria and Albert Museum, the Guggenheim, and the Smithsonian's Cooper Hewitt Museum.

== Early life and education ==
Nicanor was born in Barcelona. Her father is a filmmaker; her mother is a lawyer specializing in intellectual property in the arts. Nicanor received a bachelor's degree from the Autonomous University of Madrid, with a major in the theory and history of architecture. She also studied at the Sorbonne University and completed a master's degree in museum studies at New York University.

== Career ==
She was the first director of the Norman Foster Foundation in Madrid. She was the architecture and design curator at the Victoria and Albert Museum in London.

Nicanor had various roles at the Guggenheim Museum in New York from 2003 and 2013 including a role as the curator of architecture and design. She was the leader of the team for the traveling laboratory called the BMW Guggenheim Lab.

She became the executive director of the Rice Design Alliance at the Rice University School of Architecture in 2017.
