= Real Time Rome =

2006 exhibit by the MIT Senseable City Lab

Real Time Rome is a 2006 exhibit by the MIT Senseable City Lab, directed by professor Richard Burdett. The project used anonymized cell-phone data from sponsor Telecom Italia's Lochness platform about telecom traffic and signal strength, as well as GPS data from buses and taxis, to analyze and visualize the movement of people through Rome in real time.

Prior to Real Time Rome's debut, MIT had produced a similar project in Graz, Austria. City Lab director Carlo Ratti said at the time that the City Lab planned to expand to cities including Florence and Zaragoza.

The project debuted on September 8, 2006, at the Venice Biennale, an exhibition of fine arts and urban studies technology projects. During the demo, MIT projected several animations on Plexiglass screens, with data collected about five minutes before being shown. Brighter colors on the projections indicated areas of higher traffic, and visualizations of traffic spikes in the city. These included surges in cell-phone use during Madonna's controversial 2006 performance in Rome and Italy's victory in the World Cup.

The exhibition ran until November 19. MIT later built on the exhibit with WikiCity Rome, a similar project, in 2007.
