= Hashim Sarkis =

Lebanese educator and architect (born 1964)

- هاشم سركيس
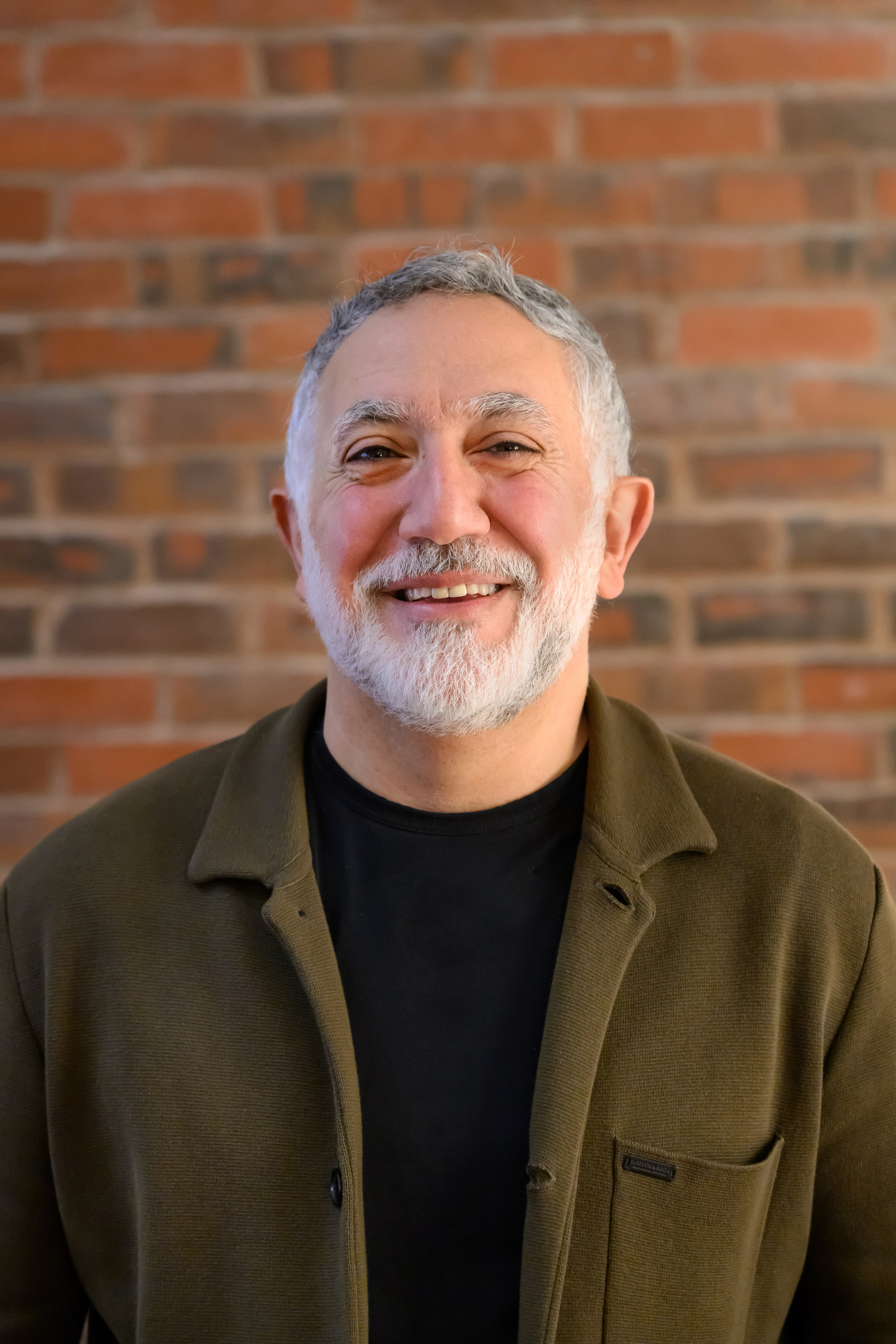
- Born: Hashim A. Sarkis; 1964 (age 61–62); Beirut, Lebanon
- Education: Rhode Island School of Design; Harvard University
- Occupations: Professor; Architect
- Spouse: Diala Ezzeddine

Hashim A. Sarkis (Arabic: هاشم سركيس; born 1964 in Beirut) is a Lebanese educator and architect. Since 2015, Sarkis has been Professor and Dean of the School of Architecture and Planning at the Massachusetts Institute of Technology. He has also been the founding principal of Hashim Sarkis Studios since 1998.

== Early Life ==
Sarkis grew up in Beirut in a modernist house designed by Karol Schayer, Wassek Adib and his father, Yousif Sarkis. He has described the house as an early influence on his interest in architecture. After leaving Lebanon to study in the United States, he remained abroad during the Lebanese Civil War. His doctoral studies at Harvard included a minor field in political philosophy, studying with John Rawls, Hilary Putnam and Roberto Mangabeira Unger.

== Career ==
Born in Beirut, Sarkis received his Bachelor of Architecture and Bachelor of Fine Arts from the Rhode Island School of Design (1987), his Master of Architecture with distinction (1989), and his Doctor of Philosophy from the Harvard University Graduate School of Design (1995). His dissertation was entitled "Publics and Architects: Re-Engaging Design in the Democracy," and was advised by Peter G. Rowe, K. Michael Hays, Jorge Silvetti, and Roberto Mangabeira Unger.

Sarkis has worked for several architecture firms, including for Rafael Moneo on Beirut Souks. In 1998, Sarkis established his own practice, Hashim Sarkis Studios, with offices in Cambridge and Beirut. From 1995 to 2015, Sarkis was a professor at the Harvard University Graduate School of Design, where he taught design studios and courses on the history and theory of architecture and urban design. From 2002 to 2014, he was the Aga Khan Professor of Landscape Architecture and Urbanism at the Harvard GSD.

Sarkis curated the 17th Venice Architecture Biennale, titled How Will We Live Together? Originally scheduled for 2020, the exhibition was postponed to 2021 because of the COVID-19 pandemic.

The exhibition explored how architecture could support collective life, addressing relationships between individuals, households, communities and the wider environment. Sarkis presented the theme as a response to increasing political divisions and economic inequalities, inviting participants to examine how shared spaces could accommodate different ways of living.

Critical responses varied. Writing in Architectural Record, Tim Abrahams praised the exhibition’s spatial and thematic organization and its optimistic approach to architecture’s social possibilities. Barbara Casavecchia, reviewing the exhibition for Frieze, questioned its inclusiveness, noting the predominance of participants from Europe and North America and the limited representation of Indigenous knowledge. In Architect, Aaron Betsky criticized the reliance on familiar European architectural forms and technological responses to environmental problems, arguing that adaptation and reuse received insufficient attention. He nevertheless praised the organizers’ achievement under pandemic conditions and Sarkis’s decision to address questions extending beyond the immediate health crisis.

On October 1st, 2024, Sarkis was appointed the newest member of the Pritzker Prize jury, along with Anne Lacaton.

In October 2026, MIT announced that Sarkis would step down as dean of the School of Architecture and Planning at the end of June 2027. Following a sabbatical, he would return to teaching and research and lead the MIT–LUMA Lab.

== Works ==
=== Completed ===
- 2004 - Agricultural and Community Center, Mejdlaya
- 2004 - Balloon Landing Park, Beirut
- 2004 - Oceana Beach Club, Damour
- 2004 - Olive Oil Press, Batroun
- 2005 - Wareham Street Loft, Boston
- 2007 - Oleana Restaurant, Cambridge
- 2007 - Housing for the Fishermen of Tyre, Abbasiyeh
- 2009 - Al Zorah, Ajman
- 2010 - Boston Eye Group, Brookline
- 2010 - Tremont Street Residence, Boston
- 2011 - The Street Pavilion, Shenzhen
- 2016 - Byblos Town Hall, Byblos
- 2016 - Dana Street House, Cambridge
- 2017 - The Courtowers, Beirut
- 2018 - Saifi Residence, Beirut

=== Publications ===
- Projecting Beirut: Episodes in the Construction and Reconstruction of a Modern City, with Peter G. Rowe, 1998, ISBN 978-3791319384
- Case: Le Corbusier's Venice Hospital and the Mat Building Revival, 2001, ISBN 978-3791325385
- Circa 1958: Lebanon in the Pictures and Plans of Constantinos Doxiadis, 2003, ISBN 978-2842894306
- Josep Lluis Sert: The Architecture of Urban Design, 1953-1969, 2008, ISBN 978-0300120653
- "The World as an Architectural Project," by Hashim Sarkis and Roi Salgueiro with Gabriel Kozlowski, 2020 ISBN 9780262043960
- Expansions, 2021 Edited by Hashim Sarkis and Ala Tannir, link
- Cohabitats, 2021 Edited by Hashim Sarkis and Ala Tannir, link

=== On Hashim Sarkis ===
- Hashim Sarkis, Curator of the 17th International Architectural Exhibition, Universes in Universes, link
- Venice Biennale Curator Hashim Sarkis: ”We are exploring the same subject that led to the pandemic”, Edwin Heathcote, Financial Times, 21.05.21, link
- The Venice Biennale, Twice delayed, takes on new relevance, Sam Lubell, New York Times, 20.05.21 link
- Hashim Sarkis discusses staging on an international biennale in “interesting times”, Samuel Medina, 05.05.21, The Architect’s Newspaper link
- Architecture is a medium that can make a difference: In conversation with Hashim Sarkis at the 2021 Venice Architectural Biennale, Christelle Harrouk, 24.05.21, arch daily, link
- Biennale Architettura 2021, press conference, 20.05.21 full video in the Biennale Architettura 2021 website link
- At the Venice Biennale, an architecture exhibition to meet the moment, Peter Dizikes, 08.07.2021. MIT News link
- ″Golden Lions to Raumlaborberlin and UAE″, John Hill, 30.08.21 World-Architects.com

== Personal life ==
Sarkis is married to Diala Ezzeddine, Chief Executive Officer of Xios Therapeutics, and they have one daughter, Dunia Alexandra.
