= Cathy de Monchaux =

British sculptor (born 1960)

- Born: 1960 (age 65–66); London, United Kingdom
- Education: Camberwell School of Art, BA; Goldsmiths, University of London, MA
- Known for: Sculpture
- Notable work: Work in progress
- Style: Post-modern, juxtaposing opposites
- Awards: Turner Prize nomination

Cathy de Monchaux (born 1960) is a British sculptor.

== Early life and education ==
Born in London, daughter of the sculptor Paul de Monchaux, de Monchaux earned her BA at the Camberwell School of Art (1980–1983) and an MA at Goldsmiths College, University of London (1985–1987).

== Style and career ==
Her sculptures use materials such as glass, paper, metal, fur and leather. Her works juxtapose seductive, soft elements, sometimes associated with strongly sexual overtones, with harder materials, often spikey or in some way appearing to constrain the softer parts, resulting in work which is both sensual and threatening. Her 1997 exhibition at the Whitechapel Gallery in particular made reference to organic forms (crustacea, fossils), animals, erotic and fetishistic imagery, turn of the century decorative traditions, architectural detailing and saintly relics.

She won a Steinberger Group Award in 1988 and the London Arts Individual Artist's Award in 1989.

De Monchaux's work from the early 1990s was often characterised by the combination of red velvet and steel in simple and strong constructions, but later works have tended to move towards lighter colours and a more ornamental approach.

De Monchaux was nominated for the Turner Prize in 1998. She lives and works in London and teaches part-time at the Slade School of Fine Art.

In her recent work, such as The Raft (2016) and State Secrets (2014), de Monchaux has concentrated more on subjects such as battles, unicorns and imagery confusing fauna, mineral and flora.

In Sweetly the Air Flew Overhead, Battle with Unicorns (2007-8), the work shows small soft sculptures of riders on unicorns entangled in string, cloth and tree figures. It is reminiscent of Uccello's Battle of San Romano series where distinct horses, lances and knights celebrate human control and clarity, not least in the painter's obsessive use of perspective. By contrast, de Monchaux depicts a battle with spike-helmet knights riding unicorns that struggle in a chaos of things: to be in a battle is to be inside a mess.

De Monchaux herself has mentioned recognising an unconscious allusion here to the Iraq War.
