= Paul de Monchaux =

British-Canadian sculptor

- Born: May 20, 1934 (age 90); Montreal, Canada
- Education: Slade School of Fine Art Art Students League of New York
- Known for: Sculpture
- Website: https://www.pauldemonchaux.co.uk/

Paul de Monchaux (born 1934) is a Canadian sculptor. He has lived and worked in the United Kingdom since 1955. He is known for his many public art commissions, which are located across Britain.

== Life ==
de Monchaux was born in Montreal, Canada, in 1934. He studied at the Art Students League of New York from 1952 to 1954 and continued his education at the Slade School of Fine Art in London from 1955 to 1958.

He began his teaching career at the Nigerian College of Technology before moving to Goldsmiths' College in London. He later taught at the Camberwell School of Art, where he served as Head of Sculpture from 1965 to 1983 and Head of Fine Art from 1984 to 1986. He retired from teaching in 1986 to concentrate on his sculpture.

He is married to the printmaker Ruth de Monchaux. Their daughters, Cathy de Monchaux and Elizabeth de Monchaux, are both sculptors.

== Works ==
Art critic Louisa Buck has written that "De Monchaux’s sculptures gather, contain and orchestrate their surroundings."

His public artworks include:

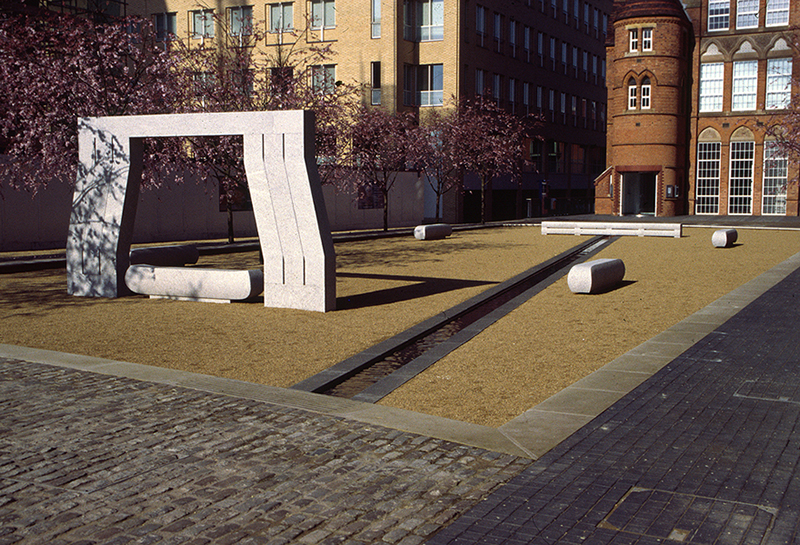
"Oozells Square Sculptures", prior to 2023 alterations.

Song (2004): Commissioned by the BBC following its television series 100 Greatest Britons, in which Winston Churchill was voted the greatest Briton. The abstract tower, made of twenty interlocking units of sawn green English heart oak, reflects Churchill’s use of poetry and rhythm in his speeches. De Monchaux said that he "was struck by Churchill's awareness of the way in which the shape of the spaces around words can amplify their meaning". Facsimiles of four original speech drafts are embedded in the sculpture. Song toured several venues including Westminster Hall before joining the collection of the Henry Moore Foundation. It is currently on display at Leeds City Art Gallery.

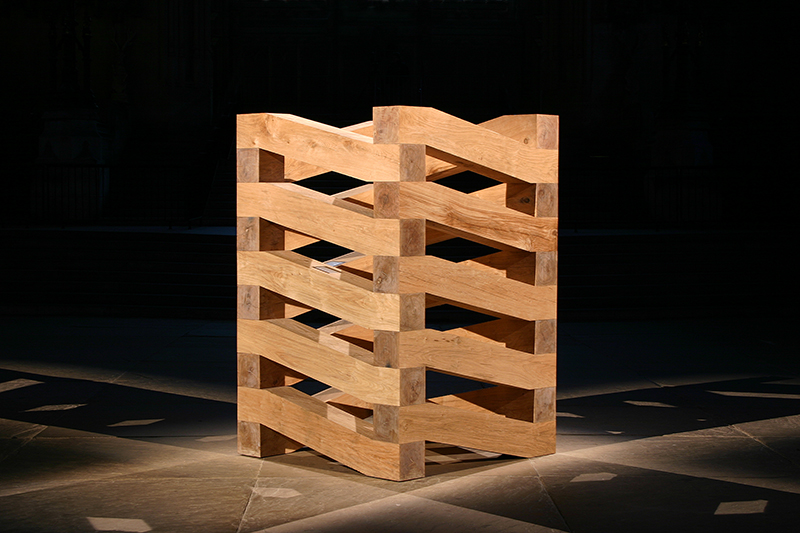
"Song", Westminster Hall installation.

Oozells Square Sculptures, Brindleyplace, Birmingham (1998): Commissioned by Argent Development Consortium, this series of seven granite sculptures was designed to complement the 38m x 14m square, pre-designed by Townshend Landscape Architects. The square was paved with consolidated ochre Raisby Gravel and featured a black granite diagonal rill, which is bridged by one of the sculptures. The project won a Civic Trust Award in 2000. In 2023, the square's original design was altered when the owners covered the surface with a 10 cm layer of loose white gravel.

Symmetry, Shrewsbury Abbey (1994): A memorial to poet Wilfred Owen, this granite and sandstone sculpture was commissioned by the Wilfred Owen Association to mark the centenary of Owen's birth.

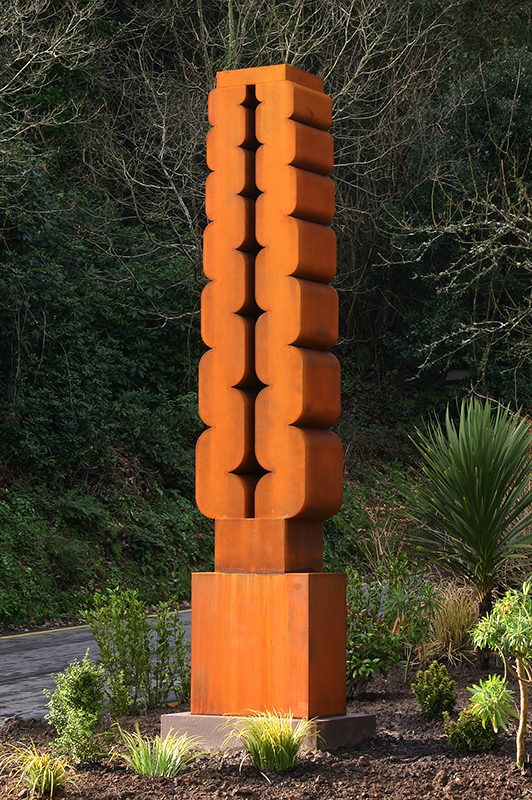
"Silence", Les Charrières Malorey, Jersey.

Enclosure, Watts Park, Southampton (2000): Commissioned by Southampton City Council with support from the National Lottery Heritage Fund, this granite and Portland stone structure stands 4 metres (13 ft) tall. It frames views of four landmarks around the park.

Breath, Norwich (2011): Commissioned by Norwich City Council as a companion to Edwin Lutyens' war memorial. The bronze sculpture, 2.63 metres (8 ft 8 in) tall, was installed after the original memorial was repositioned. The inscription reads: "The living honour the dead, only a breath divides them." de Monchaux on the piece said "In a place like this, which is all about contemplation and thinking, it seems both life and death should be referred to".

Silence, Les Charrières Malorey, Jersey (2007): Commissioned by the Jersey War Tunnels, this memorial commemorates the forced labourers who constructed the HO8 hospital and other German fortifications during the occupation of the Channel Islands. The title comes from a passage in Primo Levi’s If This Is a Man, describing the silent sleep of slave workers during their midday break. The sculpture was unveiled in January 2007 by the Bailiff of Jersey, Sir Philip Bailhache.

== Exhibitions ==
De Monchaux has held major solo exhibitions, including:

- Volutes, Megan Piper and Bowman Sculpture, London (2019)
- Formation, The Frestonian Gallery, London (2024)

He also participated in a joint exhibition titled Correspondences with painter Tess Jaray in 2020, presented by Megan Piper and The Frestonian Gallery. The exhibition catalogue included excerpts from over 400 emails exchanged by the artists over a span of 15 years.

A monograph titled Paul de Monchaux was published by Ridinghouse in 2019 (ISBN 978-1-909932-49-4).
