= Nicholas de Monchaux =

Professor of Architecture at MIT

Nicholas de Monchaux (born July 30, 1973) is a designer and author, and currently Professor and Head of Architecture at MIT. He was formerly Professor of Architecture and Urban Design in the College of Environmental Design at the University of California, Berkeley and Director of the Berkeley Center for New Media.

de Monchaux is the author of Spacesuit: Fashioning Apollo, a cultural, physical, and intellectual history of the Apollo A7L spacesuit; the book was winner of the Eugene Emme Astronautical Literature Award and shortlisted for the Author's Club Art Book (Sir Banister Fletcher) Prize. In 2016, he published Local Code: 3,659 Proposals about Data, Design, and the Nature of Cities, which combines several historical essays on urbanism, computing, and complexity with 3,659 designs for micro-scaled ecological interventions in San Francisco, Los Angeles, New York, and Venice. This work earned praise from The New York Times for its "intelligent enquiry and actionable theorizing," and was exhibited at the Biennial of the Americas, the Venice Architecture Biennale, The Lisbon Architecture Triennial, and SFMOMA.

In 2012, de Monchaux was named as one of the "Public Interest Design 100." He is a former fellow of the American Academy in Rome.
