= MIT Senseable City Lab =

Urban-planning laboratory at the Massachusetts Institute of Technology

The MIT Senseable City Lab is a research laboratory within the Department of Urban Studies and Planning (DUSP), which, in turn, is part of the MIT School of Architecture and Planning (SA+P). The lab aims to investigate and anticipate how digital technologies are changing the way people live and their implications for the built environment.

== History and description ==
Director Carlo Ratti founded the Senseable City Lab in 2004.

Its mission statement says that it seeks to creatively intervene and investigate the interface between people, technologies, and the city. The Lab's work draws on diverse fields such as urban planning, architecture, design, engineering, computer science, natural science, and economics to capture the multi-disciplinary nature of urban problems and deliver research and applications that empower citizens to make choices to make a better livable urban experience. Among the Lab's partners are a group of corporations, including AT&T, General Electric, Audi, ENEL, and SNCF, as well as cities such as Copenhagen, London, Singapore, Seattle, and Florence.

Projects have included the Copenhagen Wheel, which debuted at the 2009 United Nations Climate Change Conference, "Trash_Track" shown at the Architectural League of New York and the Seattle Public Library, "New York Talk Exchange" featured in the MoMA The Museum of Modern Art, and Real Time Rome, included in the 2006 Venice Biennale of Architecture.

In 2010 the lab opened a new research center in Singapore as part of a $35 million MIT-led initiative on the Future of Urban Mobility.

== Approach ==
The Senseable City Lab begins its project and research work with a vision for an urban future, or "urban demo". This vision is tailored to a particular city's needs and can be motivated by the challenges a place may be confronting, or by opportunities for providing new experiences or services due to advances in digital technologies. Urban demos are designed to be showcased at large public events and exhibitions to stimulate debate between citizens, public administrators, and industry. Following an urban demo, the Lab typically engages in more traditional academic research—analyzing the data that has been collected and producing research papers.

== Achievements ==
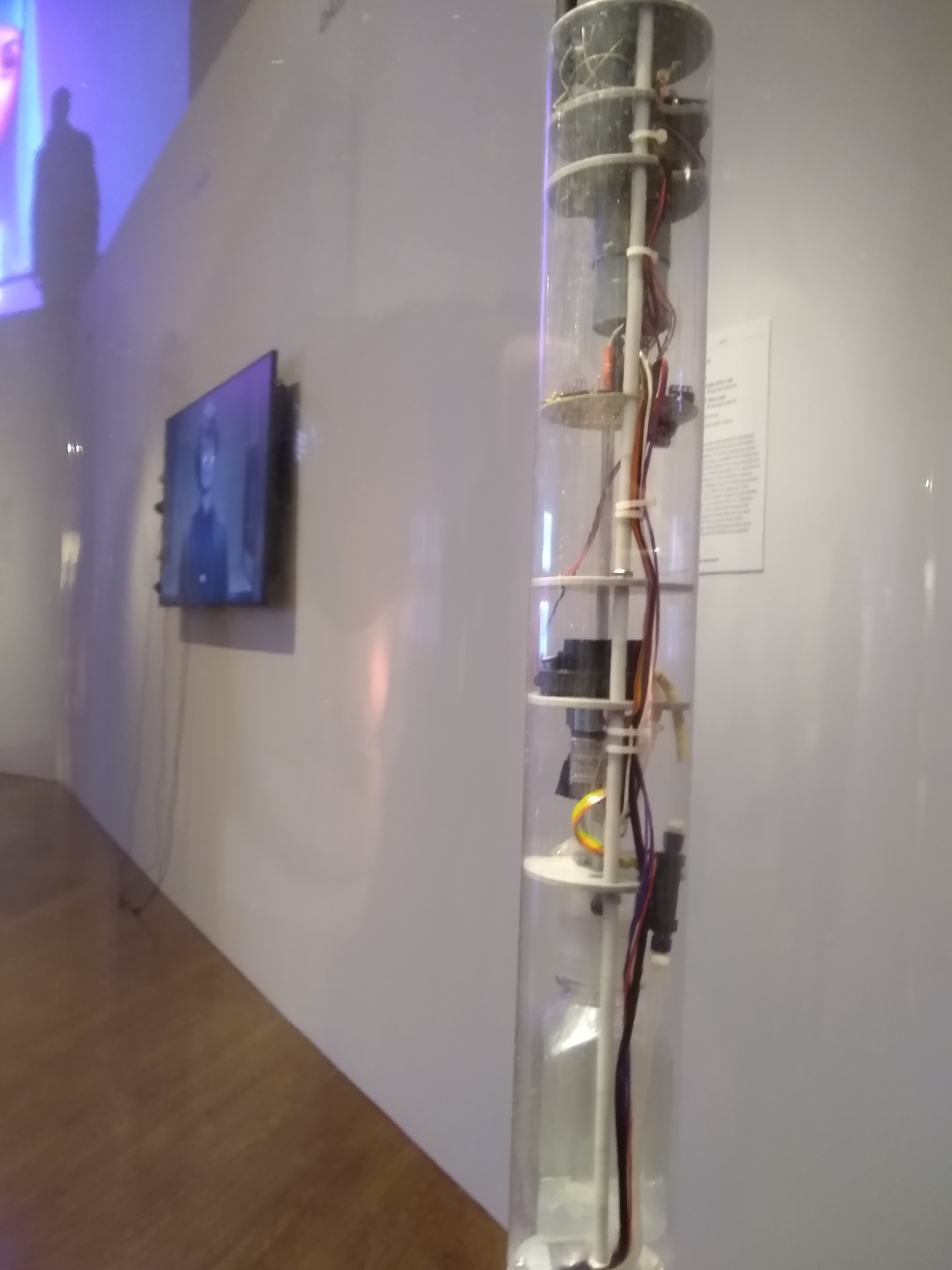
Underworlds sewage sampling and monitoring technology, ca. 2017

Since 2004, the Senseable City Lab has grown rapidly reaching 35 completed projects by 2009 with a turnover of 63 researchers from all over the world. Lab researchers have produced 166 scientific publications in high-impact academic journals such as "Eigenplaces: analysing cities using the space-time structure of the mobile phone network". The Lab's design work has been exhibited in some of the world's leading venues including the Venice Biennale, MoMA The Museum of Modern Art, the 2008 Zaragoza World Expo, the Architectural League of New York, Design Museum Barcelona, the Canadian Centre for Architecture and the MIT Museum. The Lab's work have been recognized in TIME Magazine's Best Invention of the Year 2007, Esquire Magazine's Best and Brightest 2008, Blueprint Magazine's List of 25 Who Will Change the World of Design in 2010, and Thames and Hudson's 2009 List of Innovators Shaping Our Creative Future. In January 2009, Director Carlo Ratti represented the Lab as a delegate to the World Economic Forum in Davos. In 2011, he presented at TED in Longbeach.

== Treepedia ==
Treepedia is a Senseable City Lab project whose goal is to raise awareness of urban forests. It uses digital-vision techniques based on Google Street View images. Its focus is on street trees rather than those in parks. The open-source library, stored on GitHub, includes all the Python programming code to allow anyone to use it to calculate tree cover (measured as Green View Index, or GVI) for their own city or region.
