= Virginia Tech College of Architecture, Arts, and Design =

- Motto: Ut Prosim (Latin)
- Motto in English: That I May Serve
- Type: Public University
- Established: 1964
- Parent institution: Virginia Tech
- Dean: Tsai Lu Liu
- Students: 2,020
- Undergraduates: 1,457
- Postgraduates: 563
- Location: Blacksburg; Alexandria, Virginia, U.S. Riva San Vitale, Switzerland
- Colors: Chicago maroon and Burnt orange
- Website: www.aad.vt.edu

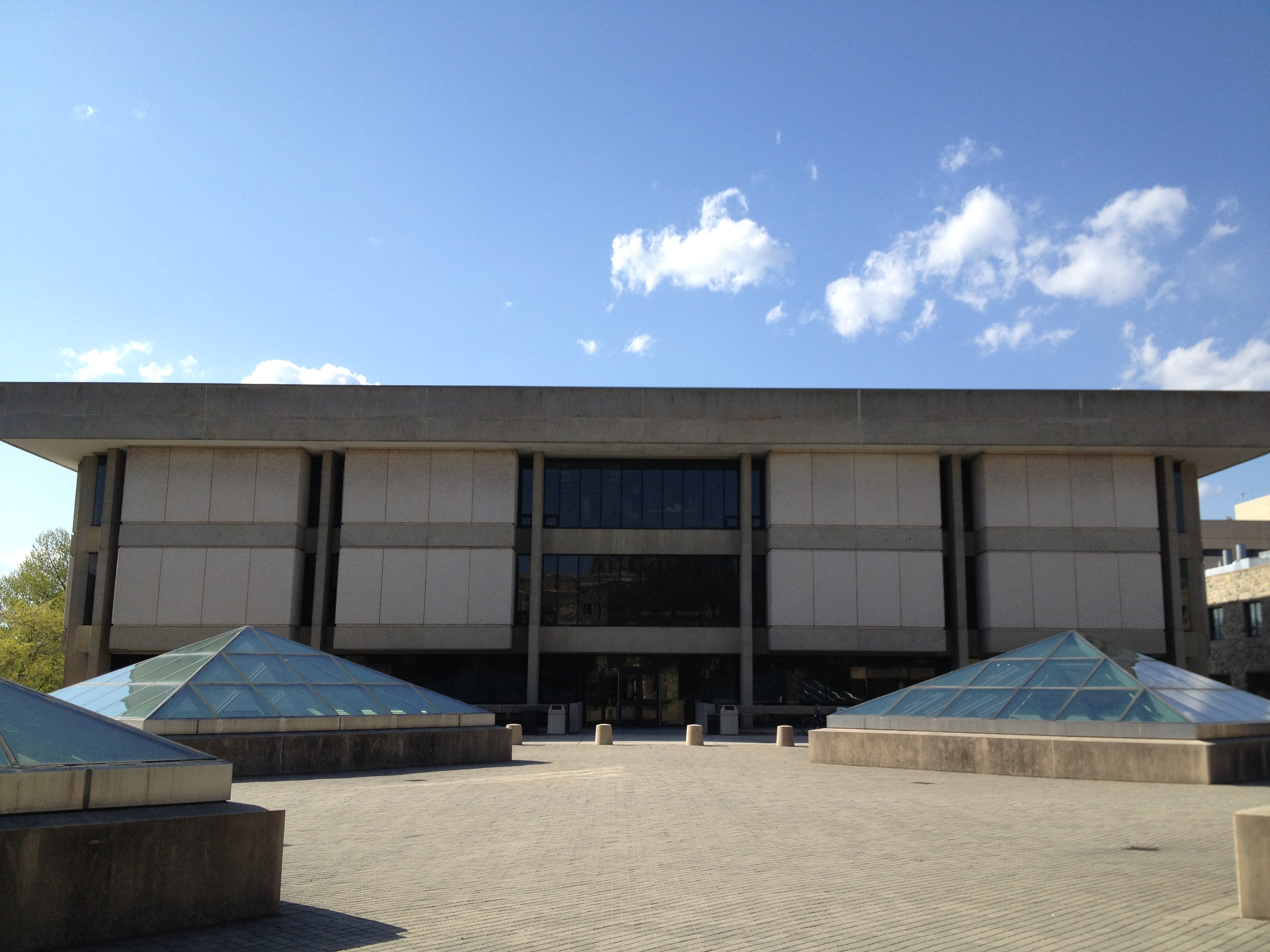
Cowgill & Burchard Halls on the Blacksburg campus.

The College of Architecture, Arts, and Design formerly the College of Architecture and Urban Studies at Virginia Tech consists of four schools, including the School of Architecture. Headquartered in Blacksburg, Virginia, the college also has sites in Alexandria, Virginia, and Riva San Vitale, Switzerland. Spread out among these three locations, the college consists of nearly 2,200 students, making it one of the largest schools of architecture in the nation.

== History ==
=== 1964-1967 ===
- 1964: The College of Architecture was founded, replacing the College of Engineering's Department of Architecture which had been formed in 1928. Charles Burchard was named the college's first dean by Virginia Tech president, T. Marshall Hahn.
- 1967: Shortly after the founding of the college, Olivio Ferrari and Herbert Kramel inspired the school to draw influences from many different sources, including the Bauhaus, and the Ulm School of Design, among others. They created the "Blue book", which was a guide for faculty members, and explained the school's general philosophy.

=== 1968-1979 ===
- 1968: Ferrari and Kramel began study abroad programs in Salzburg, Austria
- 1969: Cowgill Hall, home to the College of Architecture, opened. It was named for Clinton Cowgill, former Head of the Architecture Department (1928–1956)
- 1972: Ceramics and printmaking became part of the curricula, under the direction of Ellen Braaten and Rengin Holt
- 1973: The name of the college was changed to the College of Architecture and Urban Studies (CAUS)
- 1974: The Landscape Architecture Department was founded

=== 1980-1999 ===
- 1980: The Washington-Alexandria Architecture Center (WAAC) was founded in Alexandria, Virginia
- 1991: The school purchased a building in Riva San Vitale, Switzerland, named Casa Maderni, to be used by the school for study-abroad programs
- 1992: The Research+Demonstration Facility opened off campus to be used for projects by faculty and research interests
- 1992: Casa Maderni became the Center for European Studies and Architecture and renamed, "Villa Maderni"
- 1994: The Industrial Design program was founded
- 1996: The School of Public and International Affairs was founded as a collaboration of multiple departments to develop interdisciplinary instruction
- 1998: Burchard Hall opened adjacent to Cowgill Hall, adding new studio and workshop spaces

=== 2000-present ===
- 2003: The Architecture and Industrial Design programs were joined by the Interior Design program to found the School of Architecture + Design within College of Architecture and Urban Studies
- 2003: The Department of Art & Art History joined the College of Architecture and Urban Studies
- 2005: The Myers-Lawson School of Construction was jointly founded between CAUS and the College of Engineering
- 2007: Bishop-Favrao Hall opened, becoming the home for The Myers-Lawson School of Construction
- 2007: The Landscape Architecture program became part of the School of Architecture + Design
- 2007: The School of Visual Arts was founded
- 2008: The design/buildLAB program was founded by Keith and Marie Zawistowski
- 2009: The college's prototype mobile/solar home, LumenHAUS competed in the 2009 U.S. Dept. of Energy's Solar Decathlon
- 2010: LumenHAUS won the Solar Decathlon Europe 2010 in Madrid, Spain. It also traveled to many esteemed locations, including Times Square
- 2012: The Center for European Studies and Architecture at Villa Maderni was renovated (5200 SF) and expanded (6200 SF)
- 2012: LumenHAUS won a 2012 AIA Honor Award for Architecture
- 2014: On June 24, 2014, the Center for European Studies and Architecture was renamed the Steger Center for International Scholarship in honor of former dean, Charles Steger.
- 2017: Virginia Tech's Center for Design Research finalized the design of "FutureHAUS", which began in 2015. It is planned to enter the 2018 International Solar Competition in Dubai.
- 2022: On July 1, 2022, the name of the college was changed to the College of Architecture, Art, and Design (AAD) including a restructuring of schools within the college.
- 2022: The School of Performing Arts joined the College of Architecture, Arts, and Design
- 2023: On February 23 Tsai Lu Liu was announced to be the new dean of the College of Architecture, Arts, and Design effective July 1, 2023

Deans of the College of Architecture
Year	Name
1964-1979	Charles Burchard
1979-1981	Julio San Jose
1981-1993	Charles W. Steger
1993-1997	Patricia Edwards
1997-2006	Paul Knox
2006-2017	A. Jack Davis
2017–2021	Richard Blythe
2021–2023	Rosemary Blieszner
2023–present	Tsai Lu Liu

== Academics ==
The College of Architecture, Arts, and Design offers 11 bachelor's degrees and 6 graduate degrees through its four schools; the School of Architecture, the School of Design, the School of Performing Arts, and the School of Visual Arts. Programs offered within these schools are architecture, art history, cinema, creative technologies, graphic design, industrial design, interior design, landscape architecture, music, studio art, and theatre.

=== School of Architecture + Design ===
Programs in the School of Architecture + Design include architecture, interior design, industrial design, and landscape architecture. Through the school, students can earn Bachelor of Architecture and Master of Architecture degrees, which are accredited by the National Architectural Accrediting Board. The Bachelor of Architecture degree at Virginia Tech has been accredited by the NAAB, consecutively, since the 1957–58 academic year making it one of the oldest, accredited architecture programs in the U.S. along with Syracuse University, Cornell University, Pratt Institute, Auburn University, Rensselaer Polytechnic Institute, and University of Oregon. The School also offers professionally accredited degrees in Industrial Design (BS.IDS), Interior Design (BS.ITDS), and Landscape Architecture (BLA and MLA). Research-oriented degree programs include the Master of Science in Architecture and the PhD in Architecture and Design Research. According to the School of Architecture + Design's website, the School's mission is "to create a setting for the pursuit of theoretical, practical, and productive knowledge, embracing the duality of the education of an individual and the practice of a profession."

On the Blacksburg campus, the Architecture programs are housed in Cowgill Hall and Burchard Hall, named after the college's first dean Charles Henry Burchard. The Industrial Design Program is housed in Burchard Hall, and the Interior Design and Landscape Architecture programs are based in Burruss Hall. Architecture and Landscape Architecture studios are offered at the Nation Capital Region/Washington-DC's Washington-Alexandria Architecture Center, located in Oldtown Alexandria, Virginia, and at the Steger Center for International Scholarship, the former Center for European Studies and Architecture, in Riva San Vitale, Switzerland.

On July 5, 2022, it was announced as part of a restructuring the School of Architecture + Design was split into the School of Architecture and the School of Design.

=== School of Visual Arts ===
The School of Visual Arts offers programs in art history, visual communication design, and studio arts, with concentrations in visual communication design/graphic design, creative technologies, 3-D animation, modeling, painting, ceramics, animation, and sculpture. Areas of study include the studio arts (B.F.A.), the visual communication design (B.F.A.), art history (B.A.), and the creative technologies (M.F.A.). The school's administrative offices are located in the Armory, one of Blacksburg's historic buildings.

=== Myers-Lawson School of Construction ===
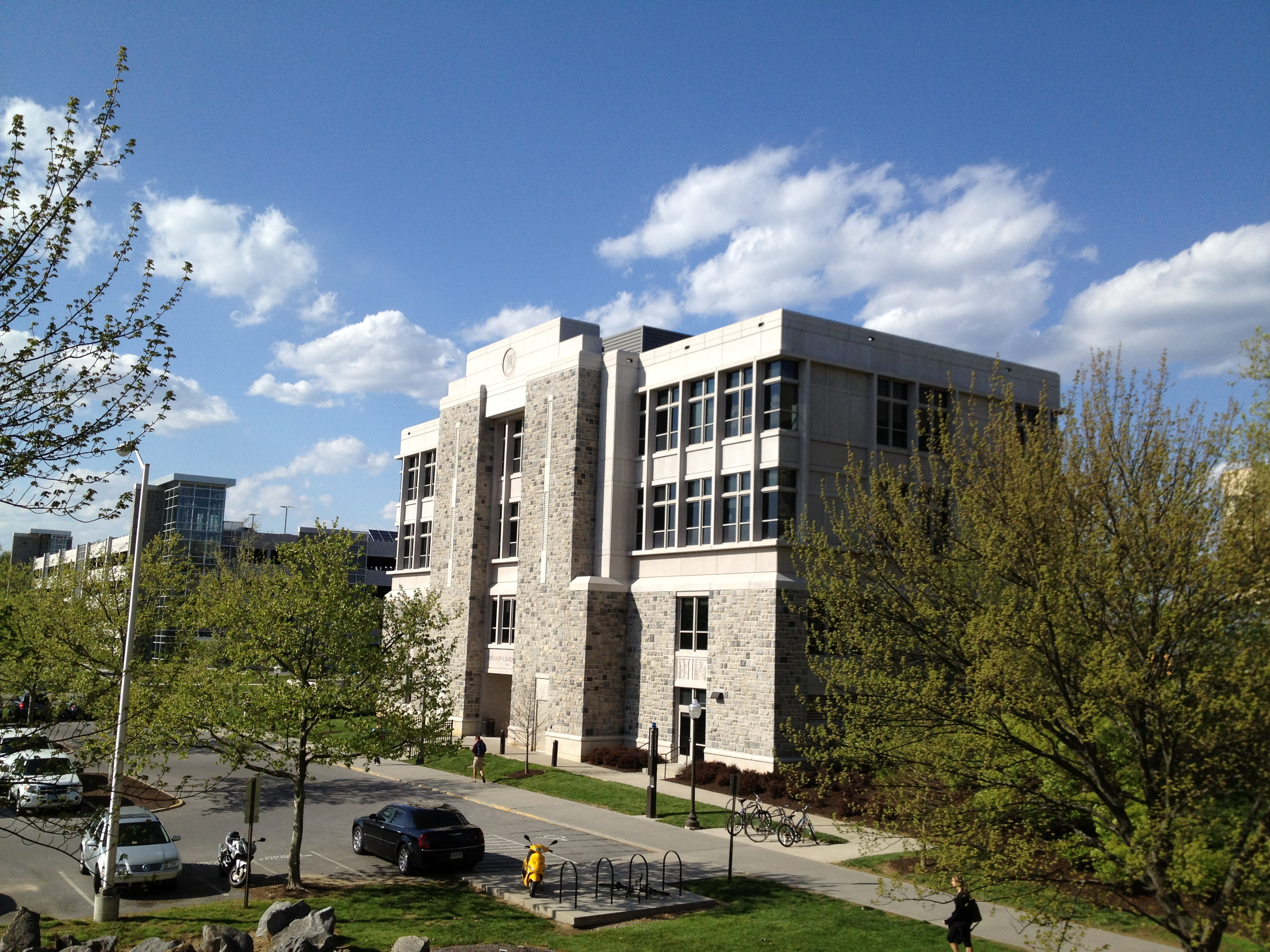
Bishop-Favrao Hall. Home to the Department of Building Construction

The Myers-Lawson School of Construction was a joint venture between the College of Architecture and Urban Studies and the College of Engineering. It was founded with a donation from A. Ross Myers and John R. Lawson II. It offers degrees in building construction and construction engineering and management. The school's programs are unique in that they blend building construction and civil engineering.

The Department of Building Construction offers a B.S. in Building Construction with two different tracks, the first track being Construction & Design, and the other track being Development, Real Estate, and Construction (which comes with a Minor in Real Estate). The department also offers a Masters of Science in Building Construction Science & Management, and a Masters of Science in Building Construction Science & Management plus an MBA. The department also hosts a PhD program.

On July 5, 2022, it was announced as part of a restructuring the Myers-Lawson School of Construction was transferred to the Virginia Tech College of Engineering.

=== School of Public and International Affairs ===
The School of Public and International Affairs was established in 2003 with the intent of offering an "innovative integration of scholarship and professional instruction in policy and planning in public administration, urban affairs, environment, governance, and international relations." The school offers undergraduate students either a Bachelor of Science in environmental policy and planning or a Bachelor of Arts in public and urban affairs. In addition, the school offers master's degrees in public administration, public and international affairs, and urban and regional planning. Doctoral students may earn degrees in planning, governance and globalization or in public administration and public affairs. The School of public and International Affairs is situated in Blacksburg, Virginia and Alexandria, Virginia.

On July 5, 2022, it was announced as part of a restructuring the School of Public and International Affairs was transferred to the Virginia Tech College of Liberal Arts and Human Sciences.

== National Capital Region programs ==
=== Washington Alexandria Architecture Center ===
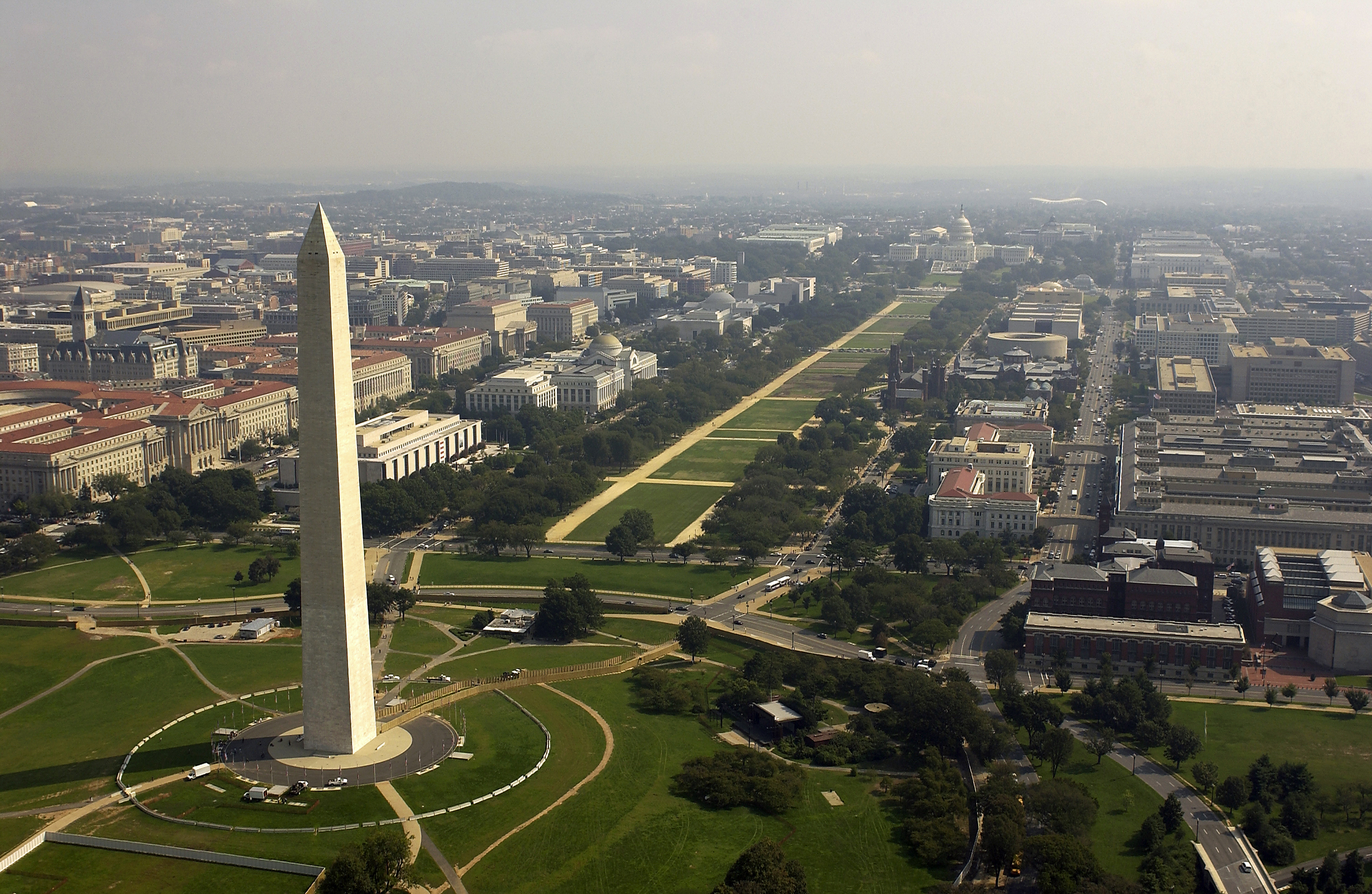
VT's National Capital Region offers Architecture, Arts, and Design programs within the Washington metropolitan area.

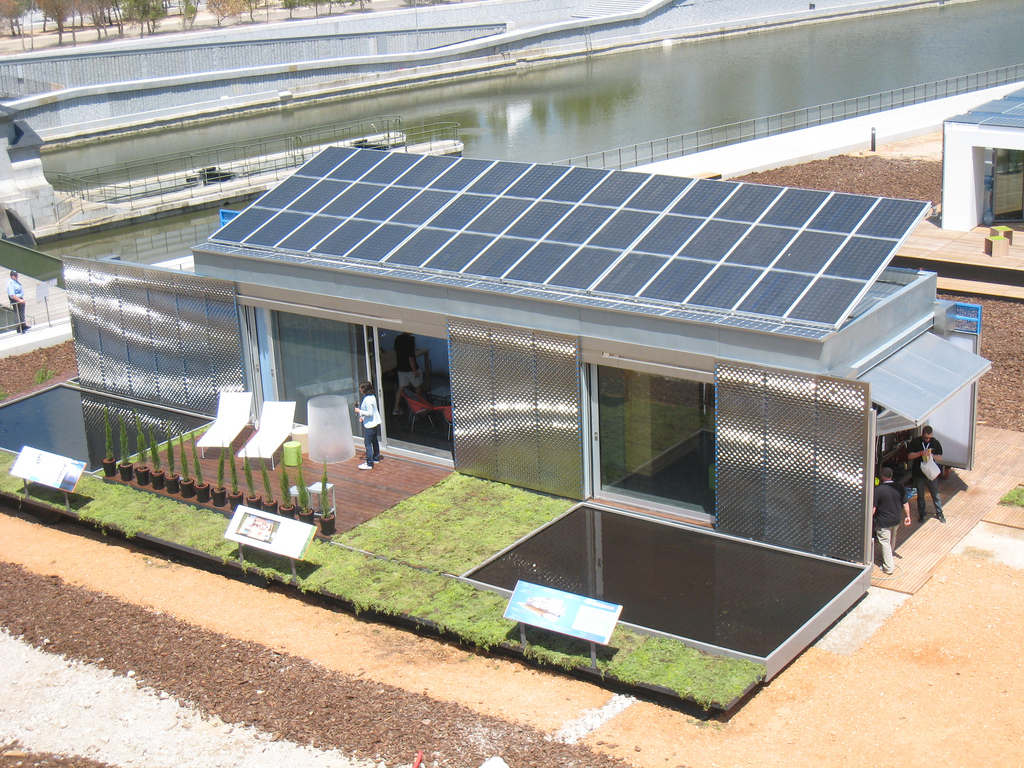
"LumenHAUS" - Award-winning solar powered house designed and constructed by Virginia Tech in 2010.

The Washington-Alexandria Architecture Center (WAAC) has been functioning as the urban extension of the School of Architecture and Design in the Virginia Tech National Capital Region since 1980. Since 1985 the WAAC has also housed a consortium of national and international architectural schools. The WAAC grants degrees in the M.Arch.1 program for those students with a five-year professional degree, and the M.Arch.2 program for students with a four-year Bachelor of Science in Architecture degree. M.Arch.3 students are able to attend the WAAC during their thesis level of study after having completed their first two years at the main campus in Blacksburg, Virginia. The WAAC also offers a Master of Landscape Architecture degree as a three-year program for individuals with a baccalaureate degree background. Students interested in a degree in Urban Design can apply through the Master of Science in architecture. The Urban Design concentration requires 3-4 semesters of study with a background in design; students without a design background can enter the program after a foundation year in the Landscape program. A Ph.D. in Architecture and Design Research is available to qualified candidates.

=== Urban Affairs and Planning ===
The Department of Urban Affairs and Planning (UAP) provides interdisciplinary teaching and learning, research and scholarship, and outreach and service in planning, public policy, and public and non-profit management to serve students, the university and society. The department's diverse programs and interdisciplinary faculty provide a wide range of professional specializations, including urban development, environment protection, economic and community development, international development, community health, housing and information technology and society. Department of Urban Affairs and Planning offers a Master of Urban & Regional Planning (MURPL) degree.

== Research Centers ==
Virginia Tech's College of Architecture, Arts, and Design is affiliated with multiple research centers for advancements by both faculty and students.

University-wide research centers include:

- Virginia Center for Housing Research
- The Institute for Policy and Governance
- The Institute for Community Health - center based in the Virginia Tech School of Public and International Affairs

College of Architecture and Urban Studies centers include:

- The Center for Innovation in Construction Safety and Health
- The Community Design Assistance Center, the Metropolitan Institute at Virginia Tech
- The Vibration Testing Laboratory
- The Research and Demonstration Facility
- The Environmental Systems Laboratory
- The Center for Advanced Visual Media

School of Architecture + Design centers include:

- The Center for Design Research
- The Center for High Performance Learning Environments
- The Center for Preservation and Rehabilitation Technology
- The Henry W. Wiss Center for Theory and History of Art and Architecture
- The International Archive of Women in Architecture
- FourDesign - a faculty-led and student-run digital and print design center based in the School of Visual Arts

=== LumenHAUS ===
The college has earned national recognition for its LumenHAUS project, a solar house designed and built by students and faculty of the School of Architecture + Design to compete in the U.S. Dept. of Energy's Solar Decathlon competition, which went on to win the international Solar Decathlon Europe Competition in Madrid, Spain in June 2010. Built from renewable and recyclable materials, the fully automated solar house is completely self-sufficient, zero-energy, and provides a new approach to environmental and sustainable design. Since the house won the competition, the house has been displayed in Times Square in New York City, N.Y.; Millennium Park in Chicago, Ill.; and on the grounds of the Farnsworth House in Plano, Ill. In 2012, the LumenHAUS received a national Institute Honor Award from the American Institute of Architects.

=== Independent Research and Scholarship by Faculty ===
Faculty members conduct sponsored and independent research and publish books with some of the leading publishers in their respective disciplines and write articles who appear in prestigious scholarly and professional journals.

== Art and Architecture Library ==
The Art and Architecture Library contains a collection of approximately 78,000 volumes and more than 200 journals, which encompass the visual arts, art history, architecture, decorative arts, and design. In addition, the library holds nearly 900 multimedia items, including DVDs, videotapes, and slides, and houses several hundred architectural plans and drawings for in-house use.

== Rankings ==
The Bachelor of Architecture and Master of Architecture programs in the School of Architecture + Design consistently rank among the top tier Architecture schools in the U.S. based on the ranking of the journal DesignIntelligence. The Bachelor of Architecture program is commonly ranked in the top five (3rd in 2016), the Master of Architecture program is usually ranked in the top 15 (9th in 2016). The undergraduate degree program in Landscape Architecture was ranked 10th in 2015 and the graduate program in Landscape Architecture was ranked 14th in 2015. The undergraduate program in Interior Design was ranked 9th in 2015. DesignIntelligence rankings are based on survey responses from a wide range of private practice organizations that were asked, "In your firm's hiring experience in the past five years, which of the following schools are best preparing students for success in the profession?"

The U.S. News & World Report also ranked some of the college's programs as top in the nation. The graduate urban planning program was ranked seventh in the nation, and the public administration graduate program was ranked twelfth in the nation. In addition, the public affairs program was ranked as twenty-seventh in the nation.

=== Ranking history ===
According to 2009 rankings by DesignIntelligence, the journal published by the Design Futures Council and the only national college ranking survey focused exclusively on design, Virginia Tech's Architecture Program was recognized as one of America's World-Class Schools of Architecture with highest distinction, tied with Harvard, Yale, and Columbia Universities. The multidimensional DesignIntelligence ranking, was based on five criteria: current rankings by professional practices; historic 10-year rankings by professional practices; rankings by academic department deans and chairs; overall campus environment and student evaluations; and program accreditation.

In addition to the school rankings by professionals, deans and chairs from academic programs participate in separate surveys for DesignIntelligence. In 2012, the deans ranked the Bachelor of Architecture program #2, citing the program's "design quality, preparation for professional practice, and collaboration with other majors." The deans ranked the undergraduate Interior Design program #3, citing its "faculty, comprehensive education, and collaborative teaching approach." The deans ranked the undergraduate Landscape Architecture program #4, citing its "excellent resources, good design program, and diversity of students." The deans' survey ranked the undergraduate program in Industrial Design #2 in the nation, citing its "emphasis on human factors, comprehensive program, and quality of students."

== Notable alumni ==
- Christian Bailey AIA
- Steve Bannon, White House Chief Strategist for the first Trump Administration
- Raymond S. Calabro, FAIA
- A. Jack Davis, FAIA
- Carl D'Silva, FAIA
- Martin Felsen, FAIA of UrbanLab
- Kevin Jones
- Robert S. Mills, FAIA
- Thomas W. Moss Jr. (building construction 1950) was Speaker of the Virginia House of Delegates from 1991 to 2000.
- Thomas S. Shiner, FAIA
- Adam M. Shalleck, FAIA
- Charles W. Steger, Ph.D. 15th President of Virginia Tech (2000 - 2014)
- Keith Zawistowski, AIA, GC, co-founder of Design/Build lab at Virginia Tech with wife, Marie Zawistowski.
