= Paul Emmons =

American architect, professor and author (born 1957)

- Born: 1957 (age 68–69)
- Education: University of Wisconsin–Eau Claire (BBA); University of Minnesota (M.Arch); University of Pennsylvania (PhD)
- Employer: Virginia Tech

Paul Emmons (born in 1957) is an American architect, professor, and author whose work focuses on the history and theory of architectural drawing practices. He is the Patrick and Nancy Lathrop Professor of Architecture at Virginia Tech's Washington-Alexandria Architecture Center (WAAC). Emmons also serves as the Associate Dean of Graduate Studies for the College of Architecture, Arts, and Design and chairs as the coordinator the History and Theory track in WAAC’s PhD program in Architecture and Design Research.

Emmons is the author of several works on architectural theory and practice, including Drawing Imagining Building (2020), Ceilings and Dreams (2019), and Confabulations (2018).

== Career ==
Since 1998, Emmons has held a number of leadership roles at Virginia Tech, primarily within the WAAC. He assumed leadership of the PhD program in Architecture and Design Research following the departure of its founder, Marco Frascari. Emmons also organizes the international Frascari Symposia, which focus architectural theory research, and was named the Patrick and Nancy Lathrop Professor of Architecture.

In addition to teaching and research, Emmons has served as Associate Dean of Graduate Studies since 2018. Among his contributions, Emmons chaired the committee responsible for creating the new College of Architecture, Arts, and Design. He established and managed the college’s Research Forum for faculty research presentations. In addition to his academic work, Emmons held editorial positions and served on the boards of several publications, such as the Journal of Architectural Education. He also acted as a manuscript reviewer for various publishing houses.

Before his role at Virginia Tech, Emmons held teaching positions at the University of Pennsylvania and the University of Minnesota. He was also the Haas Visiting Professor at Newcastle University in England.

Emmons practiced at several architecture firms in Minneapolis from 1983 to 1995. His clients include the Minneapolis Public Library and the Science Museum of Minnesota, as well as numerous universities, including the University of Minnesota, Chicago, Virginia, California, Berkeley, and Yale University.

Since moving full-time into academia, Emmons has continued a small practice of competition entries, residences, and creative works, including a collaboration with his sister, artist Carol Emmons. The duo have exhibited at venues including the Philadelphia Art Alliance. The University of Wisconsin–Milwaukee's School of Architecture and Urban Planning Building selected them to complete a permanent sculptural installation (Mneme XXXI: Dwelling in the Plan). Emmons has curated both group shows and solo exhibitions, featuring other artists and architects at WAAC such as Douglas Darden.

== Education ==
Emmons graduated from the University of Wisconsin–Eau Claire in 1979 with a Bachelor of Business Administration. He later received a Master's degree in Architecture from the University of Minnesota and a PhD in Architecture from the University of Pennsylvania.

== Bibliography ==
- Emmons, Paul (2019-04-01). Drawing Imagining Building: Embodiment in Architectural Design Practices. Routledge. ISBN 978-1-317-17952-8.
- Emmons, Paul (2003). The Image of Function: Architectural Diagrams in Handbooks and Normative Practices in the Twentieth Century. University of Pennsylvania.

=== Books edited ===
- Finishing in Architecture: Polishing, Completing, Ending (Routledge, forthcoming). Co-edited with Marcia Feuerstein and Negar Goljan.
- Drawing Imagining Building: Embodiment in Architectural Design Practices (Routledge, 2019)
- Ceilings and Dreams: The Architecture of Levity (Routledge, 2019): Co-edited with Federica Goffi and Jodi La Coe.
- Confabulations: Storytelling in Architecture (Routledge, 2018 [softcover], 2017 [hardcover]): Co-edited with Marcia Feuerstein and Carolina Dayer, the book features 226 pages and 59 colour plates.
- The Cultural Role of Architecture (Routledge, 2012): Co-edited with John Hendrix and Jane Lomholt, this book is 228 pages long and explores the impact of culture on architectural design.
