= SPIA =

SPIA may be (in alphabetical order):

- Sardar Patel International Airport, Ahmedabad
- Shanghai Pudong International Airport, Shanghai, China
- Silvio Pettirossi International Airport Asunción, Paraguay
- Single premium immediate annuity
- South Pacific Island Airways
- University of Georgia School of Public and International Affairs
- Princeton School of Public and International Affairs
- Virginia Tech School of Public and International Affairs
