= Architecture school in the United States =

Architecture schools in the United States are university schools and colleges that aim to educate students in the field of architecture. Due to the intensity of the major, only about one-fifth of students enrolled in on-campus architecture classes will graduate.

== Professional degrees ==
There are three types of professional degrees in architecture in the United States:

- Bachelor of Architecture (B.Arch), typically a 5-year program
- Master of Architecture (M.Arch), typically a 2 or 3-year program
- Doctor of Architecture (D.Arch), exclusive to the University of Hawaii at Manoa

Non-professional degrees include:

- Bachelor of Arts in Architecture (BA)
- Bachelor of Science in Architecture (BS)
- Bachelor of Fine Arts in Architecture (BFA Arch)
- Bachelor of Environmental Design (B.Envd or B.E.D.)

A non-professional degree typically takes four years to complete and may be part of the later completion of professional degree (A "4+2" plan comprises a 4-year BA or BS in Architecture followed by a 2-year Master of Architecture). The 5-year BArch and 6-year MArch are regarded as virtual equals in the registration and accreditation processes.

A professional Bachelor of Architecture degree takes five years to complete. (There is a 3-year B.Arch program offered by Florida Atlantic University articulated with an AA degree in architecture.) There are also M.Arch programs for those with undergraduate degrees in areas outside architecture; these program typically take six or seven semesters (3 or 3 1/2 years) to complete.

Other programs (such as those offered at University of Cincinnati, Drexel University, Boston Architectural College and NewSchool of Architecture and Design combine the required educational courses with the work component necessary to sit for the professional licensing exams. Programs such as this often afford students the ability to immediately test for licensure upon graduation, as opposed to having to put in several years working in the field after graduation before being able to get licensed, as is common in more traditional programs.

Some architecture schools, such as Florida International University, offer the Master of Architecture degree in an accelerated five-year or six-year format without the need of a bachelor's degree. There is an ongoing debate about whether or not to upgrade the 3.5 year M.Arch title to D.Arch, both for current students and retroactively for 3.5 year M.Arch graduates.

== Rankings ==
Each year, the journal DesignIntelligence ranks both undergraduate and graduate architecture programs that are accredited by the National Architectural Accrediting Board. These rankings, collectively called "America's Best Architecture & Design Schools" are obtained by surveying hundreds of practicing architecture leaders with direct and recent experience hiring and supervising architects. They are asked what programs they consider to be best preparing students for professional success overall. They are also asked to cite the programs they consider to be the best in educating and training for specific skills. These skills rankings are also published in "America's Best Architecture & Design Schools."

Founded in 1912 to advance the quality of architectural education, the Association of Collegiate Schools of Architecture (ACSA) represents all accredited programs and their faculty across the United States and Canada, as well as nonaccredited and international affiliate members around the world. The ACSA collects detailed information from these schools for its "Guide to Architecture Schools," which exists both as a book and as a free online searchable database at archschools.org. These publications are the only complete directories of all accredited professional architecture programs in North America and are used as a reference for prospective students, graduate students, educators, administrators, counselors, and practitioners. The ACSA Guide to Architecture Schools features detailed program descriptions, an index of specialized and related degree programs, an overview of the profession of architecture and the education process, advice on how to select the right school, and scholarship and financial aid information.

In addition, "America's Best Architecture & Design Schools" each year presents Architect Registration Examination pass rates by school, a historical review of top architecture schools, how current architecture students rank their schools, and a directory of accredited programs.

These particular alphabetical lists do not compute with a DI.net average of the past decade, leaving out a series of other brilliant institutions and including others that have just recently made the lists. The following schools have consistently been ranked within the top 17 of all undergraduate architecture schools in the nation. In alphabetical order, the top 17 schools are: Auburn University, Boston Architectural College, California Polytechnic State University, Carnegie Mellon University, Cooper Union, Cornell University, Iowa State University, Pratt Institute, Rhode Island School of Design, Rice University, Southern California Institute of Architecture, Syracuse University, University of Notre Dame, University of Oregon, University of Southern California, University of Texas at Austin, and Virginia Polytechnic Institute.

The following schools are top 10 graduate schools, in order, according to "America's Best Architecture & Design Schools 2014": Harvard University, Yale University, Columbia University, Massachusetts Institute of Technology, Cornell University tied with Rice University, University of Michigan, Kansas State University, University of California, Berkeley, University of Texas at Austin.

== List of architecture schools in the United States ==
State (city)	University	School	Control	Degrees Offered	Year founded	Website
Alabama (Auburn)	Auburn University	School of Architecture, Planning and Landscape Architecture	Public	BArch	1907	https://cadc.auburn.edu/
Alabama (Tuskegee)	Tuskegee University	Robert R. Taylor School of Architecture and Construction Science	Private	BArch	1881	https://web.archive.org/web/20130709000648/http://www.tuskegee.edu/academics/colleges/school_of_architecture_and_construction_science/dept_of_architecture.aspx
Arizona (Tucson)	University of Arizona	College of Architecture, Planning & Landscape Architecture	Public	BArch, BLA, BSSBE, MArch, MSArch, MLA, MUP, MRED, DAP	1885	https://capla.arizona.edu
Arizona (Tempe)	Arizona State University	Herberger Institute of Design	Public	MArch	2009	https://herbergerinstitute.asu.edu/
Arkansas (Fayetteville)	University of Arkansas	Fay Jones School of Architecture and Design	Public	MArch	1946	https://catalog.uark.edu/undergraduatecatalog/collegesandschools/fayjonesschoolofarchitecture/architecturearch/
California (Riverside)	California Baptist University	College of Architecture, Visual Arts, and Design	Private	MArch	2012	https://cavad.calbaptist.edu/programs/architecture-program
California (San Diego)	NewSchool of Architecture and Design	N/A	Private	MArch	1980	https://www.newschoolarch.edu
California (San Francisco)	Academy of Art University	School of Architecture	Private	BArch, MArch	1929	https://www.academyart.edu/art-degree/architecture
California (San Luis Obispo)	California Polytechnic State University	School of Architecture	Public	MArch	1901	http://www.caed.calpoly.edu/
California (Pomona)	California State Polytechnic University, Pomona	College of Environmental Design	Public	BArch, MArch	1938	https://env.cpp.edu/
California (Los Angeles)	University of Southern California	School of Architecture	Private	BArch, MArch	1914	https://arch.usc.edu/
California (Berkeley)	University of California, Berkeley	Department of Architecture	Public	MArch	1868	http://arch.ced.berkeley.edu
California (Los Angeles)	University of California, Los Angeles	Architecture and Urban Design	Public	MArch	1919	https://www.aud.ucla.edu
California (Los Angeles)	Southern California Institute of Architecture	N/A	Private	BArch, MArch	1972	https://www.sciarc.edu
California (Los Angeles / San Diego)	Woodbury University	Woodbury University School of Architecture	Private		1884	http://architecture.woodbury.edu/
Colorado (Boulder/Denver)	University of Colorado	College of Architecture & Planning	Public		1876	http://www.ucdenver.edu/academics/colleges/ArchitecturePlanning/Pages/default.aspx
Connecticut (New Haven)	Yale University	School of Architecture	Private		1916	https://www.architecture.yale.edu
Connecticut (West Hartford)	University of Hartford	College of Engineering, Technology, and Architecture	Private		1957	https://www.hartford.edu/ceta/graduate/master-of-architecture/default.aspx
District of Columbia; Washington, D.C.	University of the District of Columbia	College of Agriculture, Urban Sustainability & Environmental Sciences	Public		1851	http://www.udc.edu/causes/programs/
District of Columbia; Washington, D.C.	The Catholic University of America	School of Architecture and Planning	Private	MArch	1887	https://architecture.catholic.edu/
District of Columbia; Washington, D.C.	Howard University	Department of Architecture	Private	MArch	1867	https://cea.howard.edu/academics/departments/department-architecture
Florida (Fort Lauderdale)	Florida Atlantic University	School of Architecture	Public	BArch	1961	https://fau.edu/arch
Florida (Miami/ University Park)	Florida International University	Department of Architecture	Public		1965	https://carta.fiu.edu/architecture/
Florida (Miami)	University of Miami	School of Architecture	Private		1981	https://arc.miami.edu/
Florida (Tampa)	University of South Florida	School of Architecture and Community Design	Public		1985	http://www.arch.usf.edu/
Florida (Tallahassee)	Florida A&M University	School of Architecture	Public		1887	http://www.famu.edu/Architecture
Florida (Gainesville)	University of Florida	School of Architecture	Public		1925	https://dcp.ufl.edu/architecture/
Georgia (Atlanta)	Georgia Institute of Technology	College of Architecture	Public		1908	https://coa.gatech.edu/
Georgia (Atlanta)	Kennesaw State University	College of Architecture and Construction Management	Public		1963	https://cacm.kennesaw.edu/
Georgia (Savannah)	Savannah College of Art and Design	School of Building Arts	Private		1978	https://www.scad.edu/academics/programs/architecture
Hawaii (Manoa)	University of Hawaii at Manoa	School of Architecture	Public	MArch, DArch	1907	http://www.arch.hawaii.edu/
Idaho (Moscow)	University of Idaho	College of Art & Architecture	Public		1889	https://www.uidaho.edu/caa
Illinois (Chicago)	Illinois Institute of Technology	College of Architecture	Private			https://www.iit.edu/arch
Illinois (Chicago)	The School of the Art Institute of Chicago	Architecture, Interior Architecture, and Designed Objects	Private		1866	https://www.saic.edu/aiado/
Illinois (Chicago)	University of Illinois at Chicago	College of Architecture, Design, and the Arts	Public		1982	http://cada.uic.edu/
Illinois (Elgin)	Judson University	School of Art, Design, and Architecture	Private	MArch		https://www.judsonu.edu/academics/architecture-department/
Illinois (Urbana-Champaign)	University of Illinois	School of Architecture	Public		1870	https://arch.illinois.edu/
Indiana (Columbus)	Indiana University	Irwin Miller Architecture Program	Public		2018	https://soaad.indiana.edu/graduate/march.html
Indiana (Muncie)	Ball State University	Estopinal College of Architecture and Planning	Public		1965	http://www.bsu.edu/cap
Indiana (Notre Dame)	University of Notre Dame	School of Architecture (for traditional architecture and urbanism)	Private		1898	https://architecture.nd.edu/
Iowa (Ames)	Iowa State University	Department of Architecture	Public			https://www.design.iastate.edu/architecture/
Kansas (Lawrence)	The University of Kansas	School of Architecture and Design	Public		1912	http://www.sadp.ku.edu/
Kansas (Manhattan)	Kansas State University	College of Architecture, Planning & Design	Public	MArch	1903	https://k-state.edu
Kentucky (Lexington)	University of Kentucky	School of Architecture	Public			http://www.uky.edu/design/index.php/info/category/architecture/
Louisiana (Lafayette)	University of Louisiana at Lafayette	School of Architecture	Public		1942	https://soad.louisiana.edu/
Louisiana (New Orleans)	Tulane University	School of Architecture	Private		1894	https://web.archive.org/web/20110415000112/http://architecture.tulane.edu/home/
Louisiana (Ruston)	Louisiana Tech University	School of Design	Public	MArch	1894	https://www.latech.edu/academics/degrees-programs/liberal-arts/architecture-march.php
Maine (Augusta)	University of Maine at Augusta	Department of Architecture	Public			https://www.uma.edu/academics/programs/architecture/
Maryland (College Park)	University of Maryland	School of Architecture, Planning, and Preservation	Public			https://arch.umd.edu/
Maryland (Baltimore)	Morgan State University	School of Architecture and Planning	Public			https://www.morgan.edu/sap
Massachusetts (Amherst)	University of Massachusetts Amherst	Department of Architecture + Design	Public			http://www.umass.edu/architecture/
Massachusetts (Boston)	Boston Architectural College	N/A	Private		1889	https://the-bac.edu/
Massachusetts (Boston)	Northeastern University	School of Architecture	Private		1898	https://web.archive.org/web/20181204171532/http://www.architecture.neu.edu/
Massachusetts (Boston)	Wentworth Institute of Technology	College of Architecture, Design & Construction Management	Private		1904	https://web.archive.org/web/20131012020128/http://www.wit.edu/arch/index.html
Massachusetts (Cambridge)	Harvard University	Graduate School of Design	Private		1936	http://www.gsd.harvard.edu
Massachusetts (Boston)	Massachusetts College of Art and Design	Department of Architecture	Public		1873	https://www.massart.edu
Massachusetts (Cambridge)	Massachusetts Institute of Technology	Department of Architecture	Private	MArch	1865	https://architecture.mit.edu
Michigan (Ann Arbor)	University of Michigan	Taubman College of Architecture and Urban Planning	Public			http://www.tcaup.umich.edu/
Michigan (Berrien Springs)	Andrews University	School of Architecture & Interior Design	Private	MArch		https://www.andrews.edu/said/architecture
Michigan (Detroit)	University of Detroit Mercy	School of Architecture	Private		1877	http://architecture.udmercy.edu/
Michigan (Southfield)	Lawrence Technological University	College of Architecture and Design	Private			http://onlinedegrees.ltu.edu/online-programs/college-of-architecture-and-design/online-master-of-architecture/
Michigan (Grand Rapids)	Ferris State University	Kendall College of Art and Design	Public			https://www.kcad.edu/programs/graduate/m-arch/
Minnesota (Minneapolis)	University of Minnesota	College of Design, School of Architecture	Public			https://arch.design.umn.edu/
Mississippi (Starkville)	Mississippi State University	School of Architecture	Public			https://www.caad.msstate.edu/caad_web/sarc/home.php
Missouri (St. Louis)	Washington University in St. Louis	Sam Fox School of Design & Visual Arts - College of Architecture	Private		1910	https://web.archive.org/web/20110910141151/http://bulletin.wustl.edu/architecture/; https://samfoxschool.wustl.edu/node/4099
Missouri (Springfield)	Drury University	Hammons School of Architecture	Private		1984	https://www.drury.edu/architecture
Montana (Bozeman)	Montana State University – Bozeman	School of Architecture	Public			https://arch.montana.edu/
Nebraska (Lincoln)	University of Nebraska–Lincoln	College of Architecture	Public			https://architecture.unl.edu
Nevada (Las Vegas)	University of Nevada, Las Vegas	School of Architecture	Public			https://www.unlv.edu/architecture
New Jersey (Union)	Kean University	Michael Graves College, School of Public Architecture (SoPA)	Public		1855	https://www.kean.edu/academics/michael-graves-college-architecture-and-design/school-public-architecture/
New Jersey (Newark)	New Jersey Institute of Technology	College of Architecture and Design	Public			https://design.njit.edu/
New Jersey (Princeton)	Princeton University	School of Architecture	Private			http://soa.princeton.edu
New Mexico (Albuquerque)	University of New Mexico	School of Architecture and Planning	Public			https://saap.unm.edu//
New York (Alfred)	College of Technology at Alfred State, The State University of New York	The School of Architecture, Management and Engineering Technology	Public		1908	https://www.alfredstate.edu/
New York (Buffalo)	University at Buffalo, The State University of New York	University at Buffalo School of Architecture and Planning	Public		1968	https://ap.buffalo.edu/
New York (Ithaca)	Cornell University	College of Architecture, Art, and Planning	Private	BArch, MArch		https://aap.cornell.edu/architecture/
New York (New York City)	City University of New York/The City College	The Bernard and Anne Spitzer School of Architecture	Public	BArch, MArch	1969	http://ssa1.ccny.cuny.edu
New York (New York City)	New York City College of Technology	School of Technology & Design	Public	BArch		https://www.citytech.cuny.edu/architectural/
New York (New York City)	Columbia University	School of Architecture, Planning and Preservation	Private	BArch, MArch	1881	https://www.arch.columbia.edu/
New York (New York City)	Cooper Union	The Irwin S. Chanin School of Architecture	Private	BArch		https://www.cooper.edu/architecture
New York (New York City)	The New School	Parsons School of Design	Private	MArch		https://www.newschool.edu/parsons/constructed-environments-school-sce/
New York (New York City)	New York Institute of Technology	Department of Architecture	Private	BArch, MArch		https://www.nyit.edu/architecture
New York (New York City)	Pratt Institute	School of Architecture	Private	BArch, MArch		https://www.pratt.edu/academics/architecture/
New York (Syracuse)	Syracuse University	School of Architecture	Private	BArch, MArch, MS Arch		http://www.soa.syr.edu
New York (Troy)	Rensselaer Polytechnic Institute	School of Architecture	Private		1824	https://www.arch.rpi.edu/
North Carolina (Raleigh)	North Carolina State University	The School of Architecture	Public			https://design.ncsu.edu/academics/architecture
North Dakota (Fargo)	North Dakota State University	Department of Architecture and Landscape Architecture	Public			http://ala.ndsu.edu/
Ohio (Cincinnati)	University of Cincinnati	School of Architecture and Interior Design	Public		1869	http://daap.uc.edu/academics/said.html
Ohio (Columbus)	Ohio State University	Knowlton School of Architecture	Public			https://knowlton.osu.edu/
Ohio (Kent)	Kent State University	College of Architecture and Environmental Design	Public			https://www.kent.edu/caed/
Ohio (Oxford)	Miami University	College of Creative Arts	Public		1929	https://miamioh.edu/cca/academics/departments/arch-id/about/history/index.html
Oklahoma (Norman)	University of Oklahoma	College of Architecture	Public		1926	https://www.ou.edu/architecture.html
Oklahoma (Stillwater)	Oklahoma State University	School of Architecture	Public		1909	http://architecture.okstate.edu
Oregon (Portland)	Portland State University	School of Architecture	Public			https://www.pdx.edu/architecture
Oregon (Eugene)	University of Oregon	Department of Architecture	Public			https://architecture.uoregon.edu/
Pennsylvania (Scranton)	Marywood University	School of Architecture	Private	BEDA, BArch, BIA, BSCM, BVA, MArch, MIA	1915	https://www.marywood.edu/academics/architecture/school-of-architecture
Pennsylvania (Pittsburgh)	Carnegie Mellon University	School of Architecture	Private			https://www.cmu.edu/architecture/
Pennsylvania (Philadelphia)	Thomas Jefferson University	College of Architecture and the Built Environment	Private			http://www.PhilaU.edu/architectureandthebuiltenvironment/
Pennsylvania (State College)	Pennsylvania State University	College of Arts and Architecture	Public		1910	https://stuckeman.psu.edu/arch
Pennsylvania (Philadelphia)	Temple University	Tyler School of Art: Division of Architecture & Environmental Design	Public			https://tyler.temple.edu/programs/architecture
Pennsylvania (Philadelphia)	University of Pennsylvania	Stuart Weitzman School of Design	Private		1868	https://www.design.upenn.edu
Rhode Island (Providence)	Rhode Island School of Design	Department of Architecture	Private	BArch, MArch	1877	https://www.risd.edu
Rhode Island (Bristol)	Roger Williams University	School of Architecture, Art, and Historic Preservation	Private			https://www.rwu.edu/academics/schools-and-colleges/saahp
South Carolina (Clemson)	Clemson University	School of Architecture	Public			http://www.clemson.edu/caah/departments/architecture/
South Dakota (Brookings)	South Dakota State University	Department of Architecture	Public			https://www.sdstate.edu/architecture
Tennessee (Knoxville)	University of Tennessee	College of Architecture and Design	Public	BArch, MArch	1965	https://archdesign.utk.edu/
Tennessee (Memphis)	University of Memphis	Department of Architecture	Public			https://www.memphis.edu/architecture/
Texas (Arlington)	University of Texas at Arlington	School of Architecture	Public			http://www.uta.edu/cappa/academics/architecture/
Texas (Austin)	University of Texas at Austin	School of Architecture	Public	BArch, MArch	1948	http://www.soa.utexas.edu/
Texas (College Station)	Texas A&M University	Texas A&M College of Architecture	Public		1905	https://www.arch.tamu.edu/
Texas (Houston)	Rice University	School of Architecture	Private			https://architecture.rice.edu/
Texas (Houston)	University of Houston	Gerald D. Hines College of Architecture	Public			http://www.arch.uh.edu
Texas (Lubbock)	Texas Tech University	College of Architecture	Public			https://www.depts.ttu.edu/architecture/
Texas (Prairie View)	Prairie View A&M University	School of Architecture	Public		1876	https://www.pvamu.edu/soa/
Texas (San Antonio)	University of Texas at San Antonio	Department of Architecture	Public			http://cacp.utsa.edu/academic-programs/department-of-architecture/category/graduate-programs/
Utah (Salt Lake City)	University of Utah	College of Architecture and Planning	Public			http://www.arch.utah.edu
Vermont (Northfield)	Norwich University	School of Architecture+Art	Private		1819	https://web.archive.org/web/20161221004318/http://profschools.norwich.edu/architectureart/architecture/
Virginia (Charlottesville)	University of Virginia	School of Architecture	Public	BA		https://www.arch.virginia.edu/
Virginia (Blacksburg)	Virginia Polytechnic Institute and State University	College of Architecture and Urban Studies (Now College of Architecture, Arts, and Design)	Public	BArch, MArch, MS, PhD	1964	https://arch.vt.edu/
Virginia (Hampton)	Hampton University	School of Engineering and Technology	Private			http://architecture.set.hamptonu.edu
Washington (Seattle)	University of Washington	College of Built Environments	Public			https://arch.be.washington.edu/
Washington (Pullman)	Washington State University	The School of Design and Construction	Public			http://sdc.wsu.edu/architecture/program-info/m-arch/
Wisconsin (Milwaukee)	University of Wisconsin-Milwaukee	School of Architecture & Urban Planning	Public	BArch, MArch		https://uwm.edu/sarup/

== See also ==
- List of international architecture schools
