= Martin Felsen =

American architect

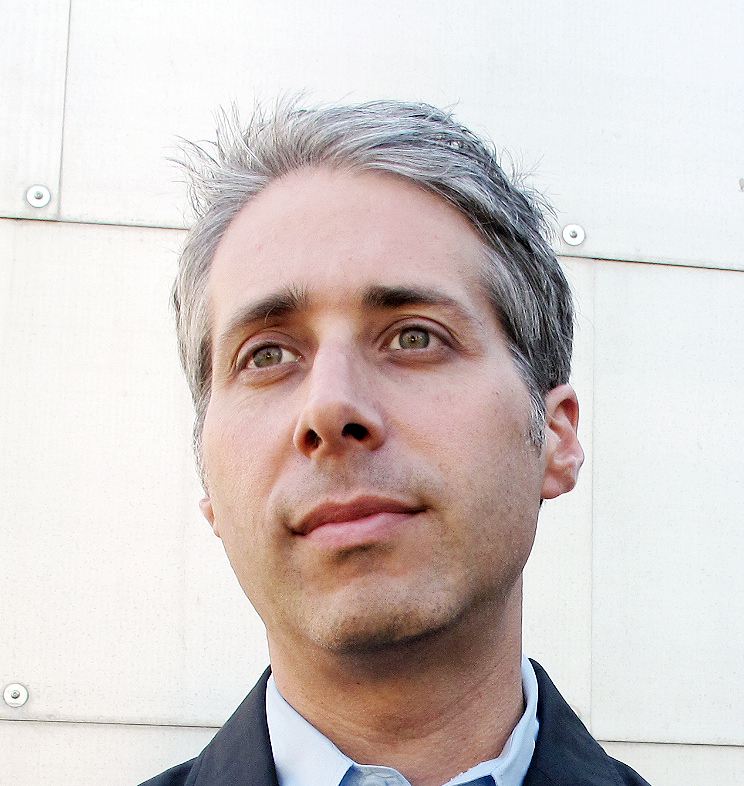
- Martin Felsen, UrbanLab
- Born: 1968 (age 57–58); Silver Spring, Maryland, U.S.
- Education: Virginia Tech (B.Arch., 1991), Columbia University (M.S., 1994)
- Employer(s): Illinois Institute of Technology; Columbia University; Washington University
- Awards: 2009 Latrobe Prize

Martin Felsen (born 1968) is an American architect and Fellow of the American Institute of Architects (FAIA). He directs UrbanLab, a Chicago-based architecture and urban design firm. Felsen's projects range in scale from houses such as the Hennepin, Illinois Residence, mixed-use residential and commercial buildings such as Upton's Naturals Headquarters, public open spaces such as the Smart Museum of Art Courtyard at the University of Chicago, and large scale, urban design projects such as Growing Water in Chicago and a masterplan (13 square kilometers / 5 square miles) for the Yangming Lake region of Changde, China. Felsen was awarded the 2009 Latrobe Prize by the American Institute of Architects, College of Fellows.

== Biography ==
Felsen earned his Bachelor of Architecture from Virginia Tech College of Architecture and Urban Studies in 1991 and a Master of Science in Advanced Architectural Design from Columbia Graduate School of Architecture, Planning and Preservation in 1994. Prior to founding his own firm, he worked for Peter Eisenman, Stan Allen, and OMA/Rem Koolhaas in Rotterdam.

In addition to practicing architecture at UrbanLab, Felsen has lectured internationally, and curated and participated in several international exhibitions about contemporary architecture and urbanism. Two public exhibitions curated by Felsen were held at the Chicago Architecture Center in 2016 and 2017. The 2016 show, titled "50 Designers, 50 Ideas, 50 Wards," exhibited transformative proposals aimed at improving the quality of life for residents in each of Chicago's 50 wards. Felsen invited fifty notable architects and teams of architects/artists to participate and produce original work. The 2017 show, titled "Between States - 50 Designers Transform Chicago's Neighborhoods," exhibited design solutions to transform underappreciated and underperforming parts of Chicago into rejuvenated civic anchors. Again, fifty notable architects and teams of architects/artists were invited to participate and produce original work. Felsen has publicly spoken about these exhibitions, along with the importance of architecture in tackling urgent issues such as globalization in cities on several occasions. Felsen was invited to participate in the Venice Biennale of Architecture (La Biennale de Venezia) in 2010 and 2012, and the Chicago Architecture Biennial in 2015 and 2017. In 2010, as the Director of Archeworks, an alternative design school, Felsen exhibited "Mobile Food Collective" in the U.S. Pavilion at the 12th International Venice Biennale of Architecture. In 2012, Felsen and UrbanLab exhibited "Fresh Water District" at the 13th International Venice Biennale of Architecture curated by David Chipperfield. In 2015, Felsen and UrbanLab exhibited "Filter Island" at the Chicago Architecture Biennial curated by Sarah Herda and Joseph Grima. In 2017, Felsen and UrbanLab exhibited "Re-Encampment" at the Chicago Architecture Biennial curated by Sharon Johnston and Mark Lee. Felsen's work has also been exhibited at the Museum of Modern Art, the National Building Museum, and the Art Institute of Chicago. Felsen has been featured in several publications such as Architect Magazine. He has received many honors for his work, including several design awards from the American Institute of Architects.

Since 1996, Felsen has taught architecture and urban design as an associate professor at the Illinois Institute of Technology. He has been a visiting professor at Columbia Graduate School of Architecture, Planning and Preservation and the Sam Fox School of Design & Visual Arts at Washington University in St. Louis. Felsen served as Director of Archeworks, an alternative design school in Chicago from 2008-11. Under his leadership, Archeworks completed several significant public interest design projects, and developed and organized two influential urban design workshops titled Infrastructures for Change. During Felsen's tenure, Archeworks’ projects were exhibited internationally at the Venice Biennale of Architecture and The Architecture Foundation in London. Felsen founded and served as editor of a new Archeworks publication titled Works.

== Bowling ==
UrbanLab: Bowling is a new book about UrbanLab's work authored by Martin Felsen and Sarah Dunn, published by Applied Research + Design. The book explores relationships and realities between cities, architecture and water. As populations steadily increase in cities, the world's natural resources are consumed at ever-faster rates. The majority of the world's populations live in countries where clean water supplies are dwindling, and these water shortages are also quickly translating into food shortages. What can designers do to avert looming water-related realities? UrbanLab: Bowling views potential water crises as opportunities to speculate on future urban design possibilities, especially in cities. Several projects are presented that take an ecological approach to re-thinking received urban design methodologies of addressing the design of water-related infrastructures in existing and new cities.

== Awards and honors ==
- 2017 named Fellow of the American Institute of Architects (FAIA)
- 2017 AIA Chicago Distinguished Building Award Citation of Merit - Mohawk House
- 2016 AIA Chicago Regional & Urban Design Honor Award - Masterplan for Changde, China
- 2015 Chicago Architecture Biennial, The State of the Art of Architecture
- 2014/15 MCHAP: Mies Crown Hall Architecture Prize, Nominated Work – Mohawk Residence
- 2014 AIA Chicago Distinguished Building Honor Award – Morgan Street Live/Work
- 2014 AIA Chicago Unbuilt Design Award, Special Recognition – MoMA PS1
- 2014 Graham Foundation for Advanced Studies in the Fine Arts Publication Grant
- 2013 AIA Chicago Sustainability Leadership Special Recognition Award – MoMA PS1
- 2012 Venice Biennale of Architecture, the 13th International Exhibition
- 2012 AIA Chicago Small Project Award - Video Arcade, Merchandise Mart
- 2011 AIA Chicago Regional & Urban Design Honor Award - Vertical Farming the Union Stock Yards
- 2010 AIA Chicago Interior Architecture Honor Award - Hennepin House, Hennepin, Illinois
- 2010 Buckminster Fuller Challenge, Honorable Mention
- 2010 Emerging Voices, Architectural League of New York - lecture delivered at the New Museum
- 2010 Venice Biennale of Architecture, Archeworks at the 12th International Exhibition
- 2009 AIA Chicago Distinguished Building Award - Hennepin House, Hennepin, Illinois
- 2009 AIA Chicago Urban Design Award - Growing Water, Chicago
- 2009 Latrobe Prize, from the American Institute of Architects (AIA) College of Fellows.
- 2009 Named Global Visionary by WBEZ, Chicago Public Radio
- 2008 AIA Chicago Unbuilt Design Award, Growing Water, Chicago
- 2008 Excellence in Education Award, American Institute of Architecture Students
- 2007 AIA Chicago Dubin Family Young Architect Award, AIA Chicago
- 2007 AIA Chicago Divine Detail Award - Hannah’s Bretzel
- 2007 National Grand Prize, The City of the Future: A Design and Engineering Challenge, The History Channel
- 2003 Emerging Visions Competition Prize, Chicago Architecture Club
- 1995 Lloyd Warren Fellowship: 82nd Paris Prize, Van Alen Institute

== Selected works ==
- UrbanLab: Bowling (Applied Research + Design Publishing, 2017) ISBN 1940743133
