= Washington-Alexandria Architecture Center =

Coordinates: 38.8047°N 77.0509°W

Virginia Tech Washington-Alexandria Architecture Center
- Motto: Ut Prosim (Latin)
- Motto in English: That I May Serve
- Type: Public university
- Established: 1980
- Affiliations: Virginia Tech
- Director: Susan Piedmont-Palladino
- Location: Alexandria, in VA, USA
- Colors: Chicago maroon and Burnt orange
- Mascot: HokieBird
- Website: www.waac.vt.edu

The Washington-Alexandria Architecture Center (WAAC), is an extension center of Virginia Tech's College of Architecture, Arts, and Design, located in Old Town Alexandria.

== Overview ==
The WAAC has operated as the urban extension of Virginia Tech's College of Architecture and Urban Studies in the Washington metropolitan area since 1980. It houses the Master of Architecture, Master of Science in Architecture with concentrations in Urban Design and History and Theory, PhD, and Undergraduate Architecture programs for 4th and 5th year students from the main campus and around the country. Sited on an urban campus in the heart of Old Town, WAAC allows upper-level undergraduate and graduate students in architecture, landscape architecture, and urban design to address the complexities of urban areas using the Washington, D.C. metropolitan region as a resource laboratory for design and research. Paul Emmons is currently the coordinator of the PhD program in Architecture and Design Research, based at the WAAC. The WAAC is a member of the National Student Exchange, welcoming design students from all the members schools.

== See also ==
- Virginia Tech
- Virginia Tech College of Architecture and Urban Studies
