= Florida International University School of Architecture =

Architecture school of Florida International University

Coordinates: 25.75887°N 80.37561°W

FIU School of Architecture
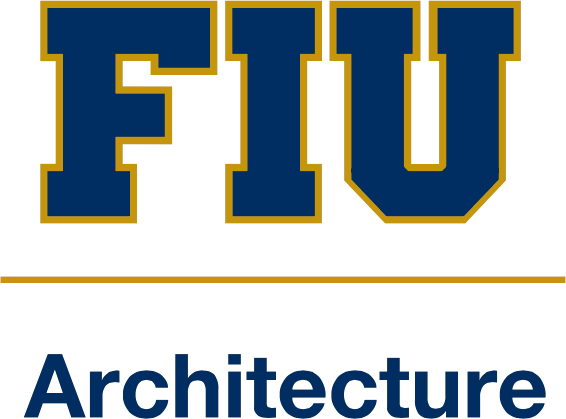
- Type: Public architecture school
- Established: 1980
- Dean: Brian Schriner (Dean, College of Architecture + The Arts)
- Location: Miami, Florida, U.S.
- Website: soa.fiu.edu

The FIU School of Architecture is the architecture school at Florida International University, located in Miami, Florida in the United States. It is one of the university's 26 schools and colleges and is a school within the College of Architecture and the Arts. The school was founded in the 1980s.

The FIU School of Architecture is composed of three closely aligned departments: Architecture, Interior Architecture, and Landscape Architecture + Environmental and Urban Design. Jointly headed by the three department chairs, the School of Architecture provides a rich and diverse platform for interdisciplinary activities at the curricular and research levels. Students in any of the SOA disciplines are taught together in a single design stream for the first two years of their curricula, and then come back together for integrated design charrettes and studios as advanced students. Under the aegis of the School of Architecture, faculty in the three design disciplines apply for grants together, collaborate on the writing of books, and undertake design research through studios and external charrettes involving graduate students.

== History ==
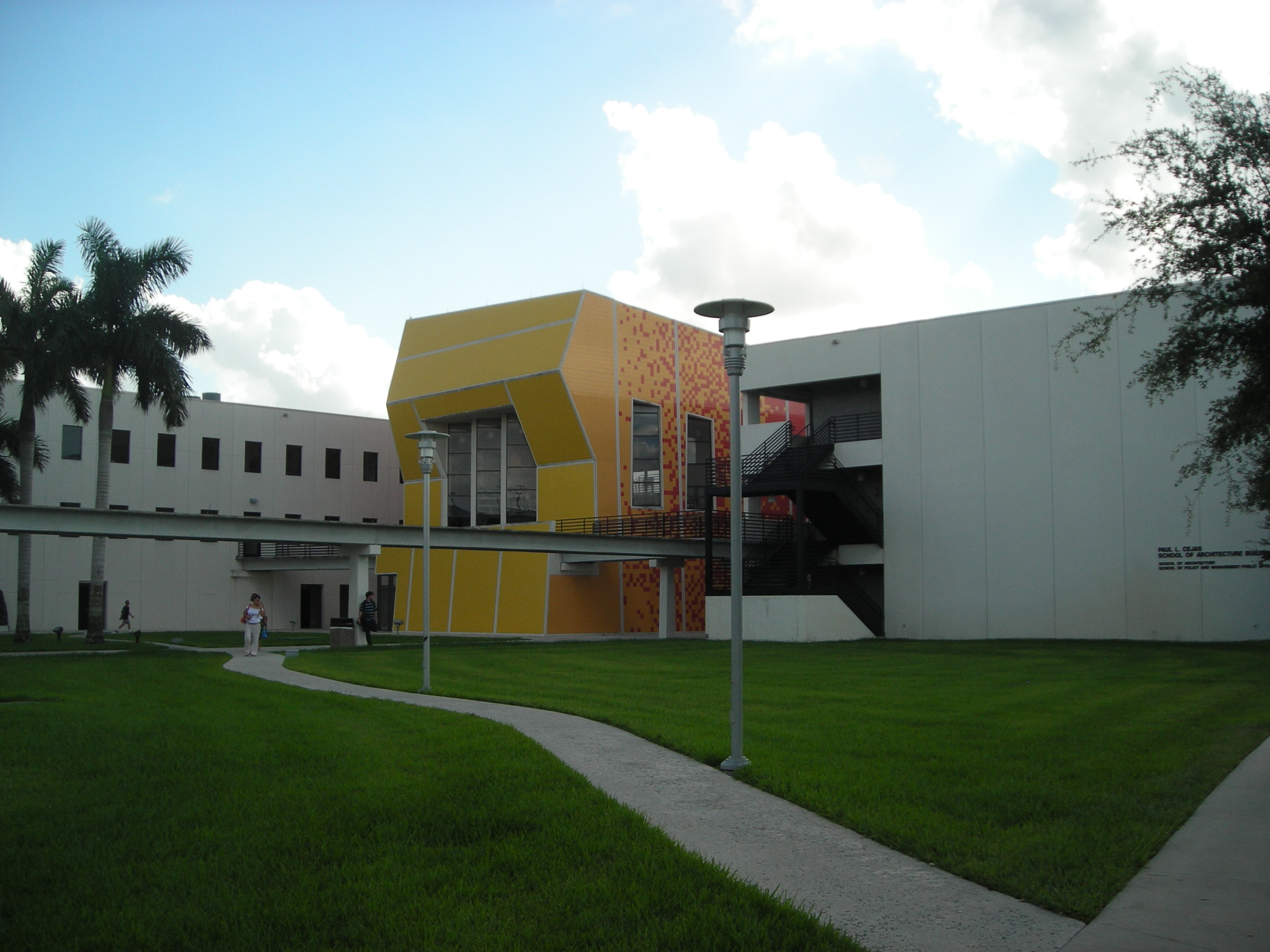
The Paul Cejas Architecture Building, designed by Bernard Tschumi in 2001, is the home of the FIU School of Architecture

In 1995, the school began its Master of Architecture program. In 2001, the school began construction on its new home, the Paul Cejas Architecture Building, and in 2003 the school moved from its decades-long home on the second floor of Viertes Haus to the Paul Cejas Architecture Building. Viertes Haus only provided enough space for classrooms and no studio spaces for the students. The Paul Cejas Architecture Building was inaugurated on April 11, 2003. The building is named after former FIU trustee Paul L. Cejas, who years ago, as a member of the state Board of Regents, championed the creation of the school and later made a significant philanthropic gifts to FIU totaling $2 million in support of the School of Architecture.

In 2008, the school converted all its undergraduate bachelor's degrees to their graduate master's equivalents. Previously, an undergraduate student would receive a Bachelor of Arts in Architecture, and then upon graduation, would apply for the 2-year Master of Architecture professional degree. Now, all undergraduate students start in their master's program beginning their freshmen year, and graduate in either 5 or 6 years.

In 2011, the School of Architecture's namesake, Paul L. Cejas donated his building at 420 Lincoln Road in South Beach to the FIU School of Architecture. The new building provides the School of Architecture studio, research, classroom, and exposition space on Miami's busiest pedestrian shopping street. Graduate architecture design studio and research classes were first held at 420 Lincoln Road in September 2011 for the Fall 2011 semester. 420 Lincoln Road marks the second FIU academic space in South Beach, along with the Wolfsonian-FIU Museum.

== Degrees ==
The FIU School of Architecture is unique amongst architecture schools in the United States in that it offers only graduate degrees for both undergraduate and graduate students. Undergraduate freshmen students begin in their graduate programs in their first semester at FIU. The school's current degrees are:

Department of Architecture:

- Undergraduate Master of Architecture, 5-year or 6-year plan for undergraduate students
- Master of Architecture, 2 or 3-years with bachelor's degree
- Master of Arts in Architecture, 1-year post-professional degree

Department of Landscape Architecture:

- Undergraduate Master of Landscape Architecture, 5-year or 6-year plan for undergraduate students
- Master of Landscape Architecture, 2 or 3-years with bachelor's degree
- Master of Arts in Landscape Architecture, 1-year post-professional degree

Department of Interior Design:

- Undergraduate Master of Interior Design, 5-year or 6-year plan for undergraduate students
- Master of Interior Design, 2 or 3-years with bachelor's degree
- Master of Arts in Interior Design, 1-year post-professional degree

== Admissions ==
FIU School of Architecture admissions

| | Fall 2011 | Fall 2009 |
|---|---|---|
| Applicants | 730 | 1,000 |
| Admits | 100 | 60 |
| % Admitted | 13.6 | 6.0 |

This table does not account deferred
applications or other unique situations.

The FIU School of Architecture is accredited by the National Architectural Accrediting Board.

Applicants applying as high school seniors and transfer students apply for the school's Undergraduate Masters programs. To be admitted students must first apply and be accepted by FIU, and must then apply to the School of Architecture separately by submitting their application, résumé, portfolio, and transcripts to their program of choice. Applicants applying as graduate students apply to the FIU Graduate School as well as the School of Architecture. Admission to both is required for admittance into the program.

For Fall 2009, first-year students, the average high school GPA was 3.98. Over 1,000 students applied to the freshman class of the School of Architecture, with 60 being accepted. This gives the FIU School of Architecture a 6% admissions rate. The FIU School of Architecture is the most competitive in Florida, with the lowest admission rate in the state at 14% (2011).

== Facilities ==
=== Paul Cejas Building at University Park ===
The SoA is located in the Paul L. Cejas School of Architecture Building on the northern side of the University Park campus. The entire SoA complex was designed by Bernard Tschumi, who won tae public competition to the design the school, beating out Spills Candela, Carreno Rizo, and Arata Isozaki. The 102,000-square-foot (9,500 m^{2}) facility was completed in 2003 and is home to the multi-media lab, workshops, and metal/wood shops. Tchumi's scheme consists of a courtyard bounded by two bar-like structures housing studios, classrooms and offices. Two irregularly shaped, vividly colored cubes located within the courtyard house the school's lecture hall, gallery, digital lab, and reading room. Taking advantage of South Florida's mild climate, the school is a sort of mini-campus in which the exterior spaces between the buildings are intended to foster interaction amongst the student body and faculty. Tschumi returned to the school to lecture during the Spring 2008 semester.

The School of Architecture building is named after Ambassador Paul L. Cejas, who is a trained architect and has been one of the school's leading champions and financial supporters over the past two decades.

The School of Architecture's library is located on the fifth floor of the Green Library.

=== FIU Architecture on Lincoln Road ===
In early 2011, the FIU School of Architecture received a donation from US Ambassador, and longtime FIU SoA donator, Paul L. Cejas. Cejas donated the use of one floor of his building at 420 Lincoln Road in South Beach, Miami to the School of Architecture. The building was remodeled for studio space for FIU Architecture graduate students and classes officially opened at 420 Lincoln Road in September 2011. Design studio classes from the architecture, landscape architecture and interior architecture departments are offered at 420 Lincoln Road, as well as research and exposition space. The new site brings the FIU School of Architecture closer to many design, art, historic and cultural facilities in the heart of the city.

== Genoa Study Abroad ==
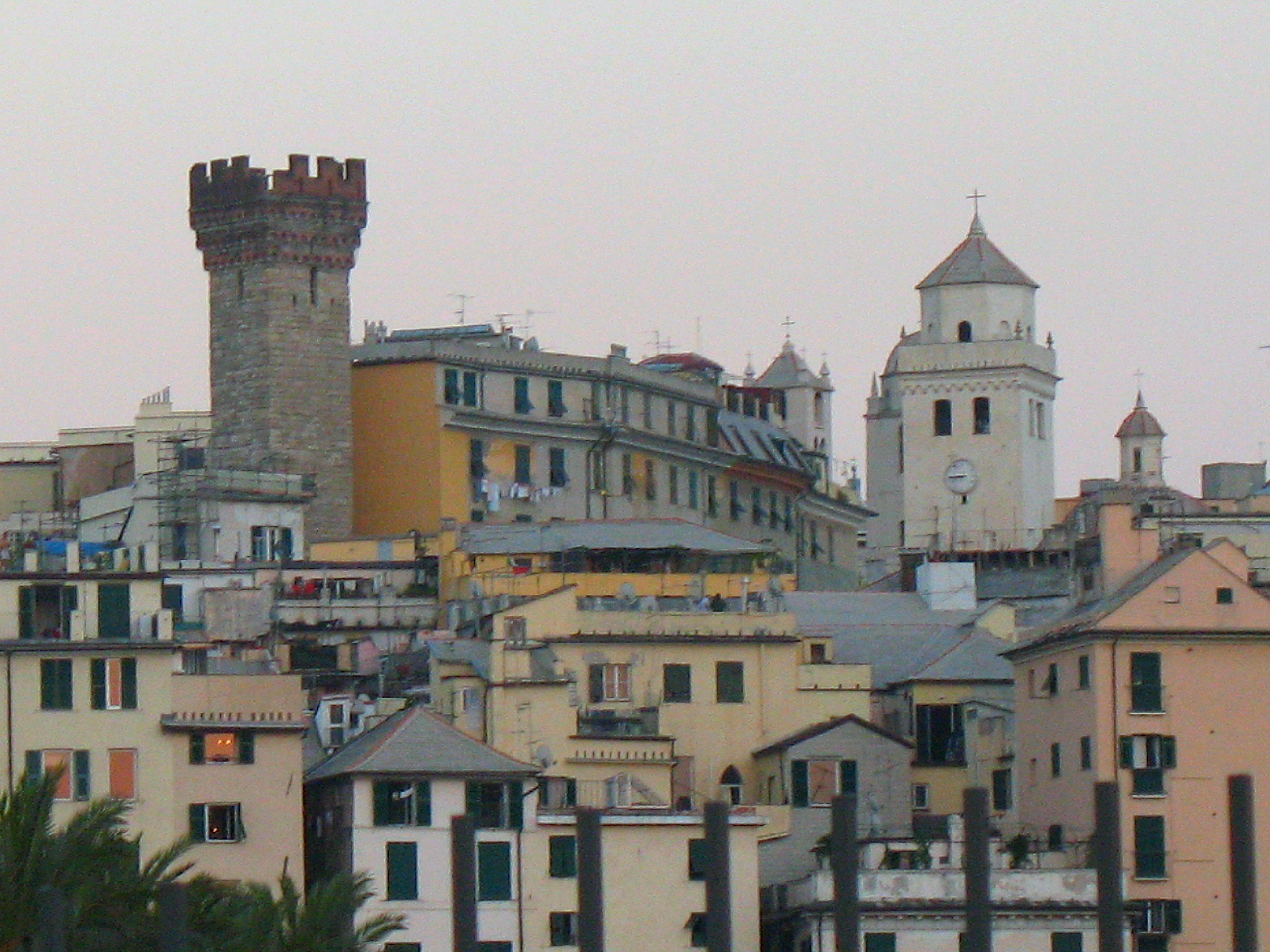
Santa Maria di Castello in Genoa, the location of the FIU School of Architecture's study abroad facilities

The School of Architecture also has a branch campus in Genoa, Italy. Students can opt to take a complete semester of courses with a focus on urban studies and Italian architecture and history in Genoa. Classes are taught by faculty at the University of Genoa and FIU Architecture's Professor Matthew Rice. Study abroad is offered every fall and spring semesters at facilities within the historic Santa Maria di Castello monastery in Genoa's historic center. Classes are taught in conjunction with the University of Genoa and Genoa's Facoltà di Architettura.

Housing is offered in various private, rented apartments scattered throughout the historic district radiating from the Facoltà di Architettura. Architecture students go in the fall semester of their fourth year, whereas interior design and landscape architecture students go in the spring semester.

== School traditions ==
=== Festival of the Trees ===
Since 1986, the School of Architecture has hosted the annual "Festival of the Tree". The festival is hosted by the interior design department and showcases a variety of designs of trees, topiaries, and particularly, Christmas trees, as the festival marks the beginning of the Christmas season. The festival is open to the public, but is primarily a fund raiser for the interior design department. Since 1986, the festival has raised over $100,000 for the interior design department.

=== Walk on Water ===
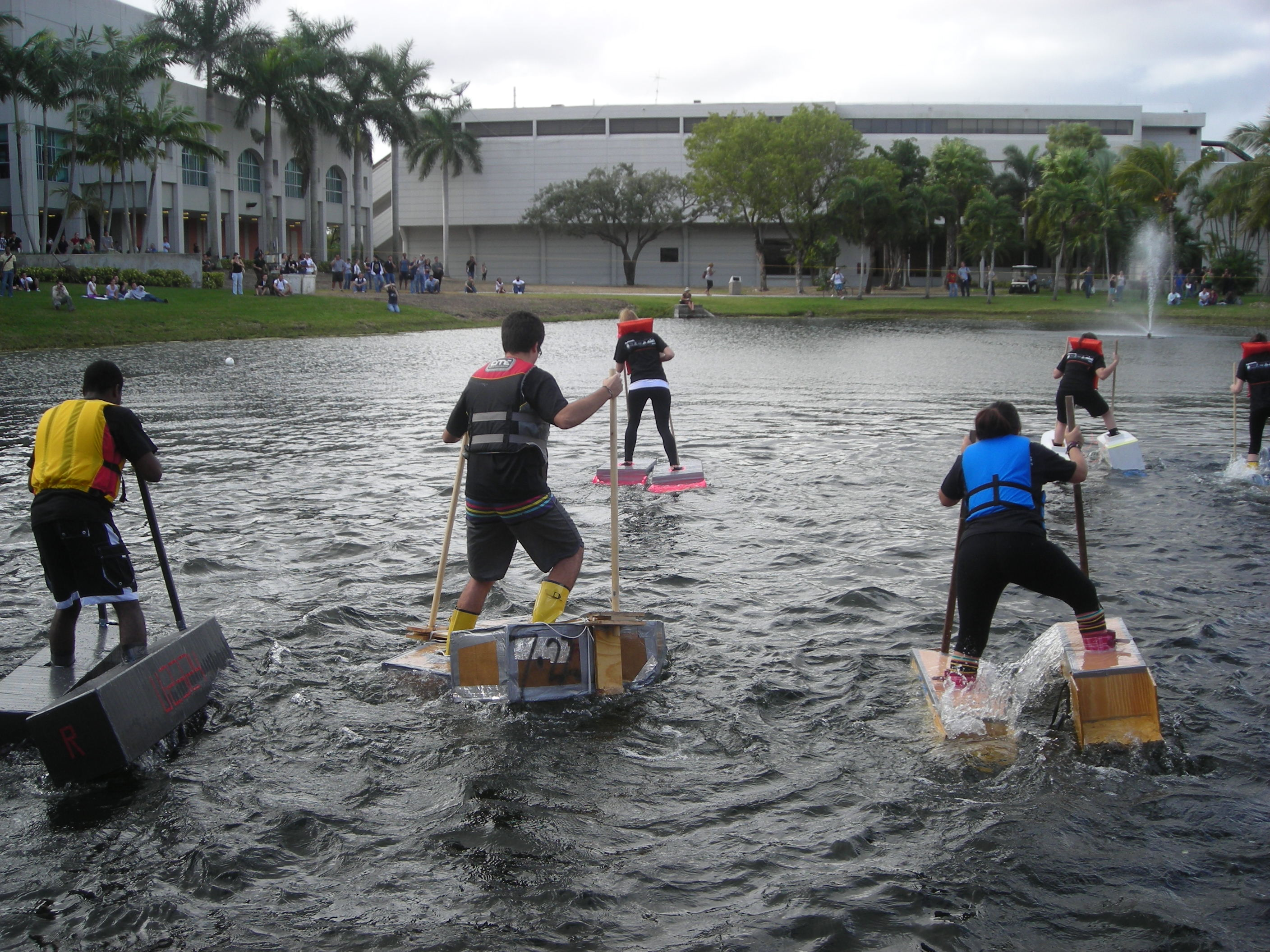
The 2008 Walk on Water race held annually is a tradition of FIU SoA alumni and students.

The Walk on Water competition is a race that all architecture students in the school must complete to graduate. Students compete in their Methods and Materials class in their sophomore year. The race has been hosted annually since 1989 by Professor Jaime Canavés. Students need to cross the 175-foot (53 m) wide lake in front of the Green Library, the university's main library, using some type of walking device, hence the "walking on water". Students must walk across to win and pass the class. Over the years, the event has become a school and university-wide tradition, and considered a rite of passage within the School of Architecture. On average, 85% students manage to make it across the lake.

Since 1989, over 1,500 FIU architecture alumni have competed in Walk on Water. The winner receives a $500 prize and an A on the project. The oldest person to cross the lake was 67 years old in 2009. The youngest was 9 years old who walked in place for his mother in 1998. The slowest time to cross the lake has been over 15 minutes.

Recent Walk on Water records

| Year | Winning student(s) | Time to cross the lake |
|---|---|---|
| 2014 | Anibal Herrera | 1:41 (25th anniversary) |
| 2013 | Rubén and Priscilla | ? |
| 2012 | Álex Quiñónez | 1:02 (All-time record) |
| 2011 | Álex Quiñónez and Ester Monterrey | 1:03 |
| 2010 | Cristina Fernández | 1:13 |
| 2009 | Cristina Fernández | 1:30 |
| 2008 | Brian Vázquez and Ana Costanzo | 1:30 |
| 2007 | N/A | 1:31 |
| 2005 | N/A | 1:23 |
| 2003 | Maria Rios and Erika Rivera | N/A |
| 2002 | Pina del Conte and Cristina Rivera | 1:16 |

== See also ==
- Architecture school in the United States
- Florida International University College of Engineering and Computing
