= Virginia Tech School of Public and International Affairs =

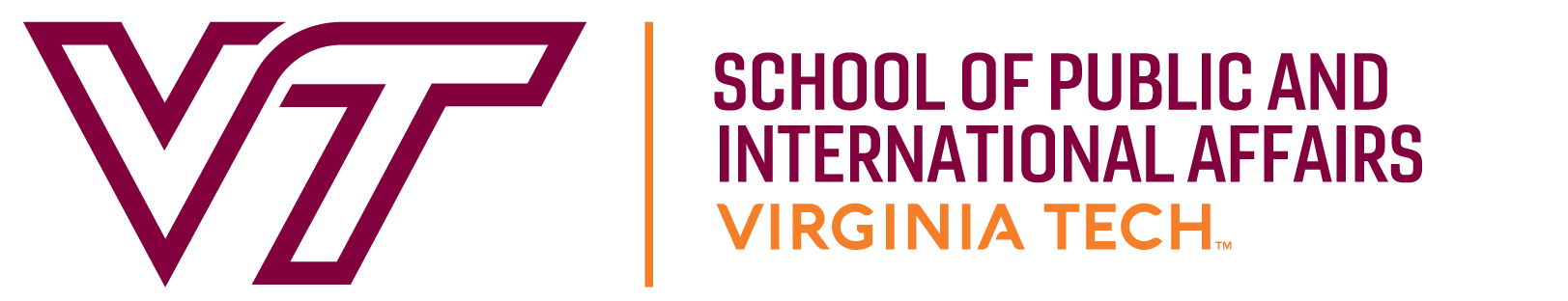
- Motto: Ut Prosim (Latin)
- Motto in English: That I May Serve
- Type: Public university
- Established: 1996
- Affiliations: Virginia Tech
- Director: Mehrzad Boroujerdi
- Location: Blacksburg, Arlington, Richmond, in Virginia, U.S.
- Colors: Chicago maroon and Burnt orange
- Mascot: HokieBird
- Website: www.spia.vt.edu

The School of Public and International Affairs (SPIA) at Virginia Tech offers graduate and undergraduate education in the fields of public administration, public policy, international affairs, urban affairs, and urban & regional planning. It has three campuses throughout Virginia: Arlington; Blacksburg and Richmond.

== History ==
The School of Public and International Affairs (SPIA) was approved by the Virginia Tech Board of Visitors in 1996 as a collaboration of five departments and programs in two colleges to develop interdisciplinary instruction, research and outreach initiatives related to public policy, planning, and administration and globalization and international development.

SPIA is one of the schools in the Virginia Tech College of Liberal Arts and Human Sciences. SPIA houses three programs:

- Government and International Affairs (GIA)
- Urban Affairs and Planning (UAP)
- Public Administration and Policy (CPAP)

== Programs ==
=== Center for Public Administration and Policy ===
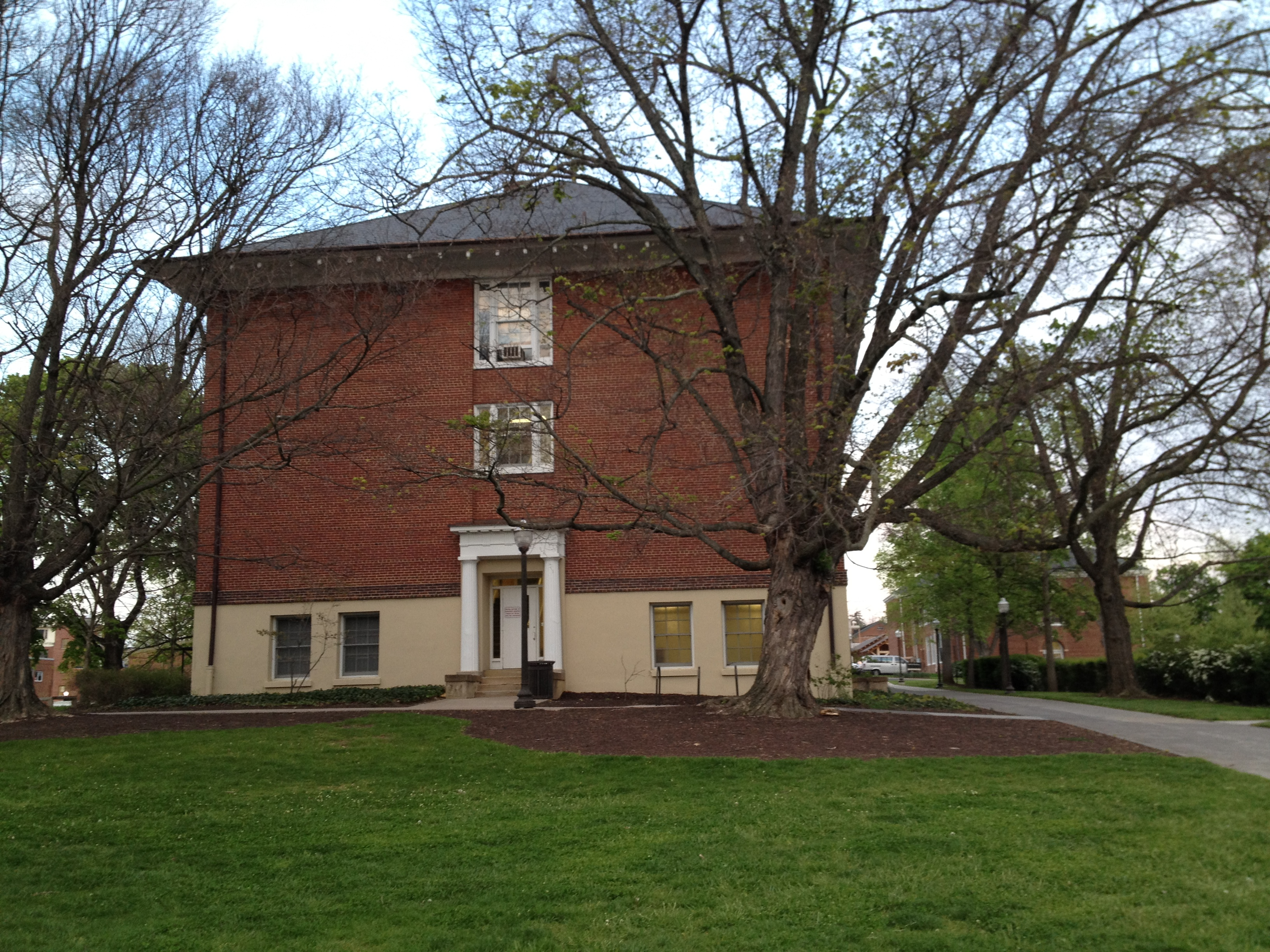
Architecture Annex is home to SPIA on the Blacksburg Campus

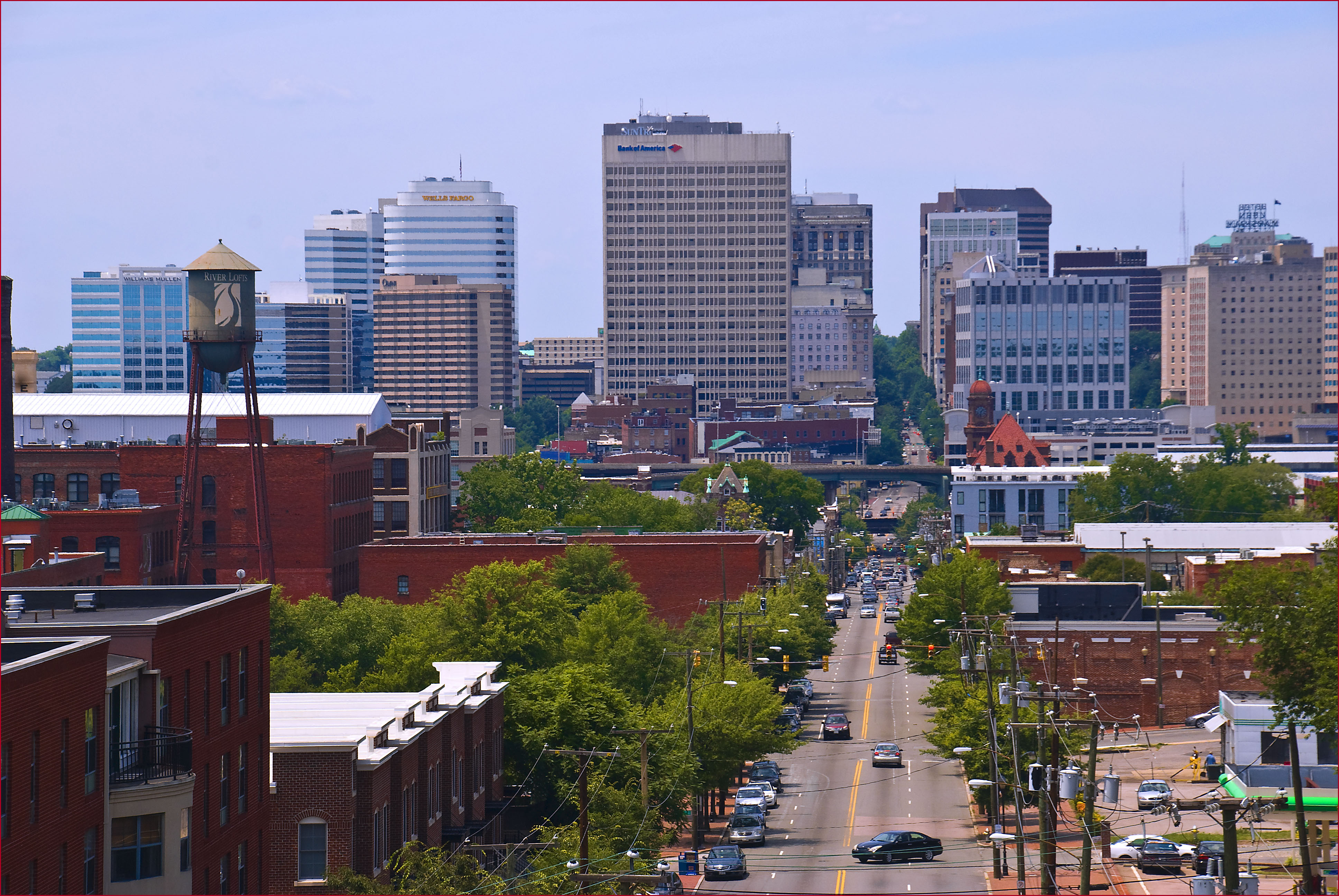
SPIA offers a MPA Program for students within the Greater Richmond Region.

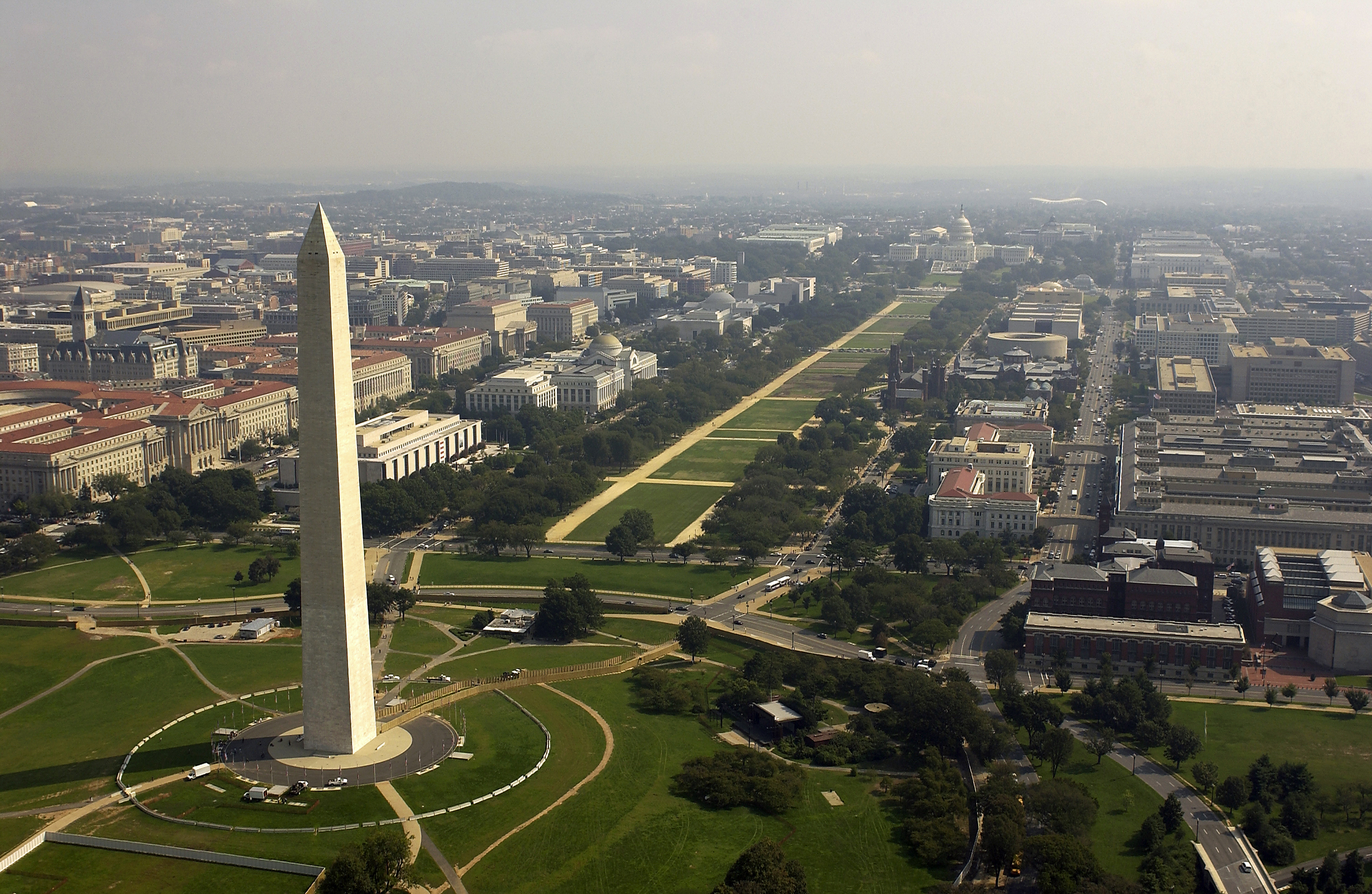
Virginia Tech National Capital Region offers a number of SPIA programs for students within the Washington metropolitan area.

The Center for Public Administration and Policy (CPAP) has three locations in Arlington, Blacksburg, and Richmond, Virginia. CPAP integrates the challenges of governing with the scholarship of public administration and public policy. CPAP offers doctoral and master's degree programs as well as graduate certificates. The majority of CPAP students take classes on a part-time basis, while working full-time in government, consulting, and non-profit positions. CPAP offers the Master of Public Administration (MPA) and Ph.D. degrees. Certificates are available in three fields: Homeland Security, Local Government Management, and Public and Nonprofit Financial Management.

=== Urban Affairs and Planning ===
The Urban Affairs and Planning program has locations in Arlington and Blacksburg and offers an interdisciplinary, comparative, hands-on approach to instruction and research in two undergraduate degrees (B.A. in Public and Urban Affairs and B.S. in Environmental Policy and Planning), an accredited master's in Urban and Regional Planning (MURP), and a doctoral program in Planning, Governance & Globalization (PGG).

=== Government and International Affairs ===
The Government and International Affairs program has locations in Arlington and Blacksburg and offers a Master of Public and International Affairs (MPIA) and a Ph.D. in Governance and Globalization with an international affairs and cultural geopolitics focus. The MPIA is a 36-credit academic-oriented master's degree with a focus on international politics, critical geopolitics, international political economy, and cultural identity politics.

=== CLAHS Affiliated Departments ===
Affiliated Departments in the College of Liberal Arts and Human Sciences (CLAHS):

- Political Science
- Geography
- International Studies
- Science and Technology Studies (joined in 2000)
- Agricultural and Applied Economics (joined in 2000)

== National Capital Region ==
In 1969, the university launched new locations within the Virginia Tech National Capital Region (NCR). These facilities serves as a hub in the Washington metropolitan area for its students and alumni. As of 2015, the NCR offers graduate programs in Public Administration, Policy, Government, and International Affairs.

In the summer of 2019, SPIA moved its Washington D.C. metro area campus from its Old Town Alexandria site to the Virginia Tech Research Center located in Arlington, Virginia.

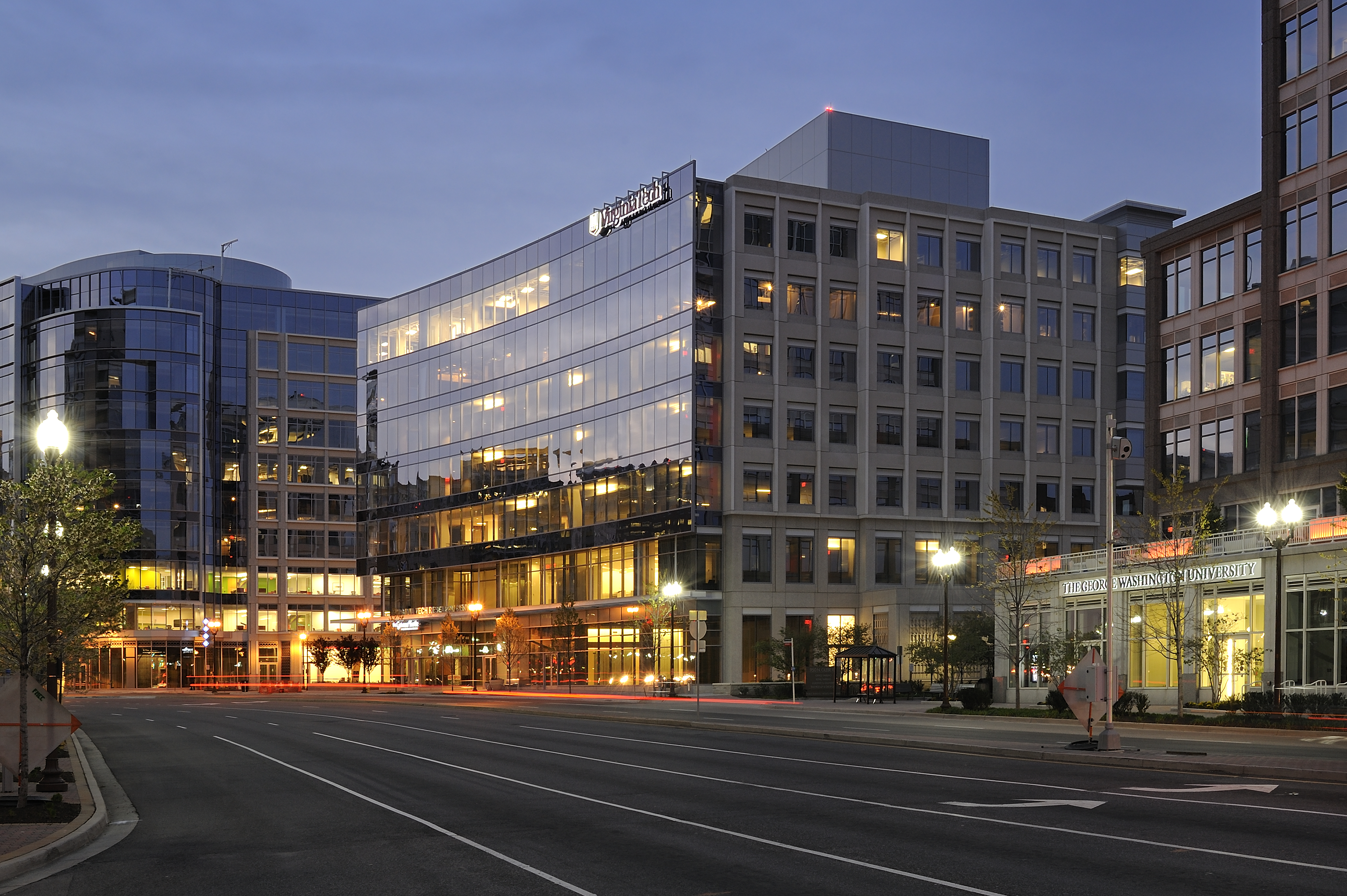
Virginia Tech Research Center located in Arlington, VA, which houses VT SPIA.

== Rankings ==
Virginia Tech's School of Public and International Affairs has received the following rankings:

- Public Affairs: No. 39 in the nation for Graduate Public Affairs in the 2020 U.S. News & World Report
- Urban Planning: No. 22 in the nation in Planetizen's Top 25 Schools For Urban Planners
- Public Management Administration: No. 15 for Best Graduate Schools in 2015 U.S. News & World Report
- Public Administration: No. 22 in the nation in Top Management Degree's Top 25 Master's of Public Administration Programs

== Research ==
In research and outreach, SPIA members lead a number of interdisciplinary efforts:

- International Refugee Research Project
- Institute for Policy and Governance

== Administration ==
SPIA is administered by a director and an SPIA Executive Committee made up of the three program chairs and one other faculty member from each program.
