= Virginia Tech College of Liberal Arts and Human Sciences =

- Motto: Ut Prosim (Latin)
- Motto in English: That I May Serve
- Type: Public University
- Established: 1964
- Affiliations: Virginia Tech
- Dean: Laura Belmonte
- Students: 4,412
- Undergraduates: 3,259
- Postgraduates: 1,153
- Location: Blacksburg, Virginia, U.S.
- Colors: Chicago maroon and Burnt orange
- Mascot: HokieBird
- Website: http://liberalarts.vt.edu

The College of Liberal Arts and Human Sciences at Virginia Tech comprises two schools, 12 departments, and three ROTC programs. The college also has connections to research facilities and local community service organizations through which students can earn experience in major related fields and has many study abroad programs. In 2010–11, the college had 4,386 students taking courses on the Blacksburg campus. The college's dean, Rosemary Blieszner, was appointed in 2017.

== History ==
The College of Liberal Arts and Human Sciences traces its roots in the university back to the Home Economics Department, which was established in 1924. As the university expanded over the next few decades, the department also grew, eventually becoming the College of Home Economics in 1964. The college then continued to grow and began to incorporate more disciplines into its programs. In 1981, the college changed its name to the College of Human Resources in order to more accurately describe the areas of study offered through the college. Then, in 1996, it added "and Education" to its name as teaching became a focus of the college.

In 2001, the College of Human Resources and Education became the College of Human Sciences and Education. The college decided to change "Resources" to "Sciences" in order to better reflect its programs and distinguish itself from the field of human resources. Then, in a university restructuring which split the College of Arts and Sciences in 2003, Senior Vice President and Provost Mark McNamee levied the current name of College of Liberal Arts and Human Sciences.

== Academics ==
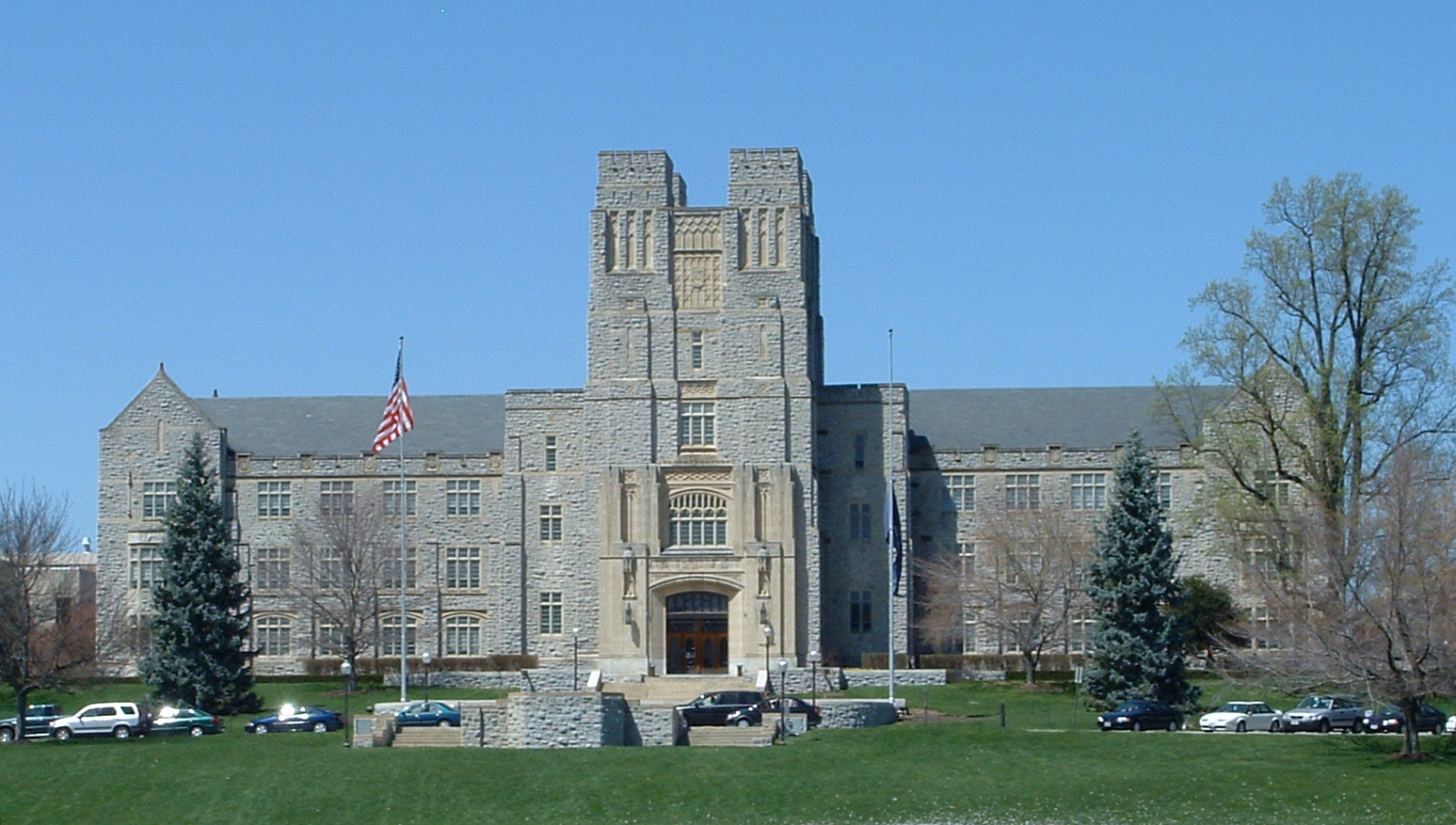
Burruss Hall

In 2010–11, the College of Liberal Arts and Human Sciences was the second largest of the university's eight colleges in terms of enrollment. The college contains the School of Education, the School of Performing Arts and Cinema, 14 academic departments, and three ROTC programs.

=== School of Education ===
The Virginia Tech School of Education offers master's, specialist, and doctoral degrees in 23 areas of professional education, leadership (K-12 and higher education), counseling, an instructional design and technology. The Department of Educational Leadership and Policy Studies, the Department of Learning Sciences and Technologies, and the Department of Teaching and Learning form the School of Education. The School of Education has been accredited by the National Council for the Accreditation of Teacher Education (NCATE) since 1973.

=== School of Performing Arts ===
The School of Performing Arts is an administrative, programmatic unit within the university, bringing together the faculty, staff, and students in the Department of Music, the Department of Theatre, and the Department of Cinema. The school's mission is to elevate awareness and expand the impact of the shared creative experience through discovery, learning, and engagement.

On July 5, 2022, it was announced the School of Performing Arts was being transferred to the newly renamed College of Architecture, Arts, and Design.

=== Departments ===
The College of Liberal Arts and Human Sciences offers multiple undergraduate and graduate degrees through its 12 academic departments and two schools:

- Alliance for Social, Political, Ethical, and Cultural Thought (ASPECT)
- Apparel, Housing, and Resource Management
- Communication
- English
- History
- Human Development and Family Science
- Modern and Classical Languages and Literatures
- Philosophy
- Political Science
- Religion and Culture
- School of Education
- School of Public and International Affairs
- Science, Technology, and Society
- Sociology

=== ROTC programs ===
The College of Liberal Arts and Human Sciences houses the university's Air Force, Army, and Naval ROTC programs. The goal of the ROTC programs is to prepare cadets to become commissioned officers on active duty upon graduation, and Virginia Tech's programs have had success in reaching this goal. Since 2005, the Air Force ROTC program has had eighty-nine percent of its graduates who wanted rated positions earn them. In addition, ninety percent of the Naval ROTC's graduating midshipmen in 2010 received their first choice for service selection.

== Research, outreach, and creative scholarship ==
The College of Liberal Arts and Human Sciences has connections to research facilities and local community service organizations that often allow students to gain experience in their major-related fields. Students can also initiate their own research ideas through the college's Undergraduate Research Institute. In addition, the university's Moss Arts Center includes a 1,260-seat performance theatre, visual arts galleries, and the Institute for Creativity, Arts, and Technology.

=== Adult Day Services ===
Adult Day Services is part of Virginia Tech's Department of Human Development and Family Science in the College of Liberal Arts and Human Sciences. The organization strives to provide a service to New River Valley older adults and their families, a teaching site for students at Virginia Tech and other institutions devoted to learning about community-based care for older adults, and a research site for faculty and students interested in designing, testing, and implementing projects involving issues on aging. Adult Day Services opened in November 1992 in Wallace Hall next to the Child Development Center for Learning and Research (then Child Laboratory Center). This location allows Adult Day Services, in conjunction with the Child Development Center for Learning and Research, to offer an intergenerational program, Neighbors Growing Together, which encourages interaction between children and older adults.

=== Child Development Center for Learning and Research ===
The Virginia Tech Child Development Center for Learning and Research, part of Virginia Tech's Department of Human Development and Family Science, located in Wallace Hall on the Blacksburg campus, is a nationally accredited, full-time preschool for young children that provides educational experiences for those interested in studying child development and early childhood education. Additionally, the center attempts to generate new knowledge about child development and early childhood education through the study, observation, and research of this topic. The philosophy of the center is grounded in social constructivist theory.

=== The Family Therapy Center ===
The Department of Human Development and Family Science' Family Therapy Center offers psychotherapy and counseling to thousands of couples, families, individuals, and organizations in the New River Valley and surrounding areas. Therapists specialize in working with couples, families, and individuals in emotional distress, as well as providing consultation to businesses and organizations. The Family Therapy Center is located on University Boulevard in Blacksburg, Virginia

=== L2Ork ===
Founded by Ivica Ico Bukvic in May 2009 as part of Virginia Tech Music Department's Digital Interactive Sound & Intermedia Studio, L2Ork is the world's first laptop orchestra powered by Linux. L2Ork has performed at a number of college campuses, including Virginia Tech, Duke University, and Southern Illinois University. In 2011, the group went on tour in Europe. They performed in Austria, Slovenia, Hungary, Germany, Croatia, Netherlands, France, and Norway.

=== Philologia ===
Philologia, which is Greek for "scholarship, love of learning," is an undergraduate research journal created by students in the College of Liberal Arts and Human Sciences in 2009. It is an annually published, multidisciplinary, peer-reviewed journal featuring the work of liberal arts students, primarily from Virginia Tech but also from other ACC schools.

=== Virginia Tech Writing Center ===
The Virginia Tech Writing Center, located in Newman Library, is open to all Virginia Tech students, faculty, and staff. Clients may walk-in or schedule appointments onlinefor assistance with writing and reading assignments. The Writing Center's staff consists primarily of undergraduate and graduate students, most of whom are English students. For clients who need help after normal business hours, the Writing Center also has satellite locations in Donaldson-Brown Graduate Life Center and Femoyer Hall.

== Rankings ==
Although Virginia Tech is not typically known for its liberal arts programs, students and programs in the College of Liberal Arts and Human Sciences have earned top national rankings over the past few years. In 2011, three Virginia Tech apparel, housing, and resource management students placed in the top 10 out of 401 college and university competitors in the National Kitchen & Bath Association/General Electric (NKBA/GE) Charette Competition. The competition required that students propose a plan for a kitchen renovation within a three-hour time constraint. Students had to submit a floor plan with specifications, an elevation of the design, and a design statement.

The Department of English's M.F.A. program in creative writing has also received national attention. In 2011, the bi-monthly magazine, Poets & Writers, recognized Virginia Tech as 35th among 527 M.F.A. programs nationally, positioning it in the top 7 percent. The magazine also ranked Virginia Tech's M.F.A. program 10th in poetry, which has the program continuing its upward trend.

The 2010 U.S. News & World Report guide to university graduate programs ranked Virginia Tech's School of Education in the top 100 schools of education. The guide also ranked the School of Education's career and technical education tied for fourth among vocational and technical specialties for the second year in a row.

In addition, College Factual ranked Virginia Tech's Department of Human Development & Family Science 4th in the nation, placing it among the top 5 percent of programs in the United States and the highest-ranked program in Virginia. The Marriage and Family Therapy (MFT) concentration is home to the oldest continuously accredited doctoral Marriage and Family Therapy program in the United States, accredited by the Commission on Accreditation for Marriage and Family Therapy Education (COAMFTE), the accrediting body of the American Association for Marriage and Family Therapy (AAMFT). USA Today previously ranked Virginia Tech as the nation's second-best institution for students pursuing a major in Human Development and Family Studies related field.

According to U.S. News & World Report, Virginia Tech's Sociology Graduate Program is ranked in the top 100 in the U.S.

The Political Science program at Virginia Tech was ranked 13th in the country for return on investment. This study, performed by AC Online, stated that Virginia Tech students majoring in political science averaged a 30-year return on investment of $763,700.

== Distinguished faculty ==
- Nikki Giovanni is a University Distinguished Professor of English as well as a world-renowned poet, writer, commentator, and activist. Giovanni has made a huge impact on the Virginia Tech campus through her leadership following April 16, 2007 and a monetary gift she made in 2010 with Virginia Tech English professor Virginia Fowler in order to promote the arts and humanities at the university.
- Timothy Luke is a University Distinguished Professor of political science and program chair of the government and international affairs program in the School of Public and International Affairs in the College of Architecture and Urban Studies.
- Lucinda Roy, an Alumni Distinguished Professor of English, is a novelist, educator, and poet. Currently, she teaches graduate classes in the college's Creative Writing M.F.A. program.

== Notable alumni ==
- Don Strock (secondary education 1973) played quarterback in the NFL from 1973 through 1989 and spent 14 years (1973–87) with the Miami Dolphins.
- J. Scott Burhoe (sociology 1976) assumed duties as the 39th superintendent of the U.S. Coast Guard Academy in New London, Conn., in January 2007.
- Sharyn E. McCrumb (M.A. English 1985), three-time winner of the Agatha Award, has written over 20 novels, several of which have made the New York Times best-seller list.
- Hoda Kotb (communication 1986), co-anchor of the fourth hour of Today, has been a Dateline NBC correspondent since April 1998 and the host of the weekly syndicated series Your Total Health since September 2004.
- Chet Culver (political science 1988) was the 41st governor of Iowa from 2007 to 2011.
- Vernell "Bimbo" Coles, who studied housing, interior design, and resource management, was Virginia Tech's first student-athlete to participate in the Olympics, playing point guard on the 1988 U.S. basketball team in South Korea. He also played in the NBA, ending his 14-year career with the Miami Heat after the 2003–04 season.
- Dell Curry (sociology 1990) was selected 15th overall in the 1986 NBA draft by the Utah Jazz and played in the league for 16 years, 10 of them for the Charlotte Hornets.
- Deborah A.P. Hersman (international studies 1992, political science 1992) was sworn in as the 12th chairman of the National Transportation Safety Board on July 28, 2009, following her nomination to the post by President Obama and confirmation by the U.S. Senate.
- Antonio Freeman (housing and residential management 1995) was a wide receiver in the National Football League.
- Michelle Krusiec (theatre arts 1995), the former host of Travelers on the Discovery Channel, has made more than 30 guest appearances on primetime television shows, such as Grey's Anatomy, Without a Trace, NCIS, Monk, and Cold Case; Krusiec's performance in the Alice Wu film Saving Face garnered her a Best Actress nomination for the Golden Horse award.
- Michael Vick, who studied in the Department of Sociology, currently plays as quarterback for the Philadelphia Eagles.
- André Davis (Residential Property Management 2002) is a wide receiver and kick returner in the NFL.
- Tim Leaton (communication 2007) is an assistant editor in Hollywood whose resume includes working on shows and videos, such as The Marriage Ref, Supernanny, Mega Shark Versus Giant Octopus, and The Terminators.
