= UrbanLab =

American architecture and urban design firm

- Growing Water masterplan in Chicago

Practice information
- Key architects: Martin Felsen, FAIA
- Founded: 2001
- Headquarters: Chicago, Illinois, United States

UrbanLab is an American architecture and urban design firm with headquarters in Chicago. Founded by Martin Felsen, FAIA, and Sarah Dunn in 2001, the office is known for its focus on sustainability, creative experimentation and a collaborative approach to buildings, spaces and cities.

== Background ==
UrbanLab's projects range in scale from houses such as the Hennepin, Illinois, Residence, mixed-use residential and commercial buildings such as Upton’s Naturals Headquarters, public open spaces such as the Smart Museum of Art Courtyard at the University of Chicago, and large scale, urban design projects such as Growing Water in Chicago and a masterplan (13 square kilometers / 5 square miles) for the Yangming Lake region of Changde, China. UrbanLab was awarded the 2009 Latrobe Prize by the American Institute of Architects, College of Fellows.

== Growing Water ==
UrbanLab won a competition for the History Channel's City of the Future: A Design and Engineering Challenge. The competition asked architects in three cities, New York, Chicago and Los Angeles, to develop a conceptual plan for their city 100 years from now. The teams competed and a finalist for each city was named. In the final round of the competition, with the acclaimed architect Daniel Libeskind as master of ceremonies, UrbanLab was announced the national winner after a month-long online vote.

UrbanLab's project, Growing Water, starts with the assumption that in 100 years that "water will be the new oil" and envisions a Chicago that recycles 100 % of its waste water back into Lake Michigan. The project is inspired by Chicago's rich history including its boulevard system, the reversal of the Chicago River and the Deep Tunnel project. The plan calls for new boulevards to be created that would channel waste water from buildings into greenhouse and wetland systems that would clean the water and send it back the lake while creating a new network of social and recreational spaces, new parks, and corridors. These new corridors would be termed "eco-boulevards" and be spaced about every half-mile in the city.

== Bowling ==
UrbanLab: Bowling is a new book about UrbanLab’s work written by Felsen and Dunn, published by Applied Research + Design. The book explores relationships and realities between cities, architecture and water. As populations steadily increase in cities, the world’s natural resources are consumed at ever-faster rates. The majority of the world’s populations live in countries where clean water supplies are dwindling, and these water shortages are also quickly translating into food shortages. What can designers do to avert looming water-related realities? UrbanLab: Bowling views potential water crises as opportunities to speculate on future urban design possibilities, especially in cities. Several projects are presented that take an ecological approach to re-thinking received urban design methodologies of addressing the design of water-related infrastructures in existing and new cities.

== Awards and honors ==
- 1995 Lloyd Warren Fellowship: 82nd Paris Prize, Van Alen Institute
- 2003 Emerging Visions Competition Prize, Chicago Architecture Club
- 2007 National Grand Prize, The City of the Future: A Design and Engineering Challenge, The History Channel
- 2007 AIA Divine Detail Award — Hannah’s Bretzel
- 2007 Dubin Family Young Architect Award, AIA Chicago
- 2008 Excellence in Education Award, American Institute of Architecture Students
- 2008 AIA Unbuilt Design Award, Growing Water, Chicago
- 2009 Global Visionary by WBEZ, Chicago Public Radio
- 2009 Latrobe Prize, from the American Institute of Architects (AIA) College of Fellows.
- 2009 AIA Urban Design Award — Growing Water, Chicago
- 2009 AIA Distinguished Building Award — Hennepin House, Hennepin, Illinois
- 2010 Venice Biennale of Architecture, Archeworks at the 12th International Exhibition
- 2010 Emerging Voices, Architectural League of New York — lecture delivered at the New Museum
- 2010 Buckminster Fuller Challenge, Honorable Mention
- 2010 AIA Interior Architecture Honor Award — Hennepin House, Hennepin, Illinois
- 2011 AIA Regional & Urban Design Honor Award — Vertical Farming the Union Stock Yards
- 2012 AIA Small Project Award — Video Arcade, Merchandise Mart
- 2012 Venice Biennale of Architecture, the 13th International Exhibition
- 2013 AIA Sustainability Leadership Special Recognition Award — MoMA PS1
- 2014 Graham Foundation for Advanced Studies in the Fine Arts Publication Grant
- 2014 AIA Unbuilt Design Award, Special Recognition — MoMA PS1
- 2014 AIA Distinguished Building Honor Award — Morgan Street Live/Work
- 2014/15 MCHAP: Mies Crown Hall Architecture Prize, Nominated Work — Mohawk Residence
- 2015 Chicago Architecture Biennial, The State of the Art of Architecture
- 2016 AIA Regional & Urban Design Honor Award — Masterplan for Changde, China
