= University of Utah College of Architecture and Planning =

Architecture school at the University of Utah

Coordinates: 40°45′40″N 111°50′41″W

The University of Utah College of Architecture + Planning (also known as CAP) is an academic college of the University of Utah, offering undergraduate and graduate degrees in architecture, city and metropolitan planning, game design, and multi-disciplinary design. The College also offers graduate certificates in historic preservation, entertainment arts, urban planning, real estate development and urban design. The School of Architecture and Department of City and Metropolitan Planning are the only accredited programs in their discipline in the state.

== College History ==
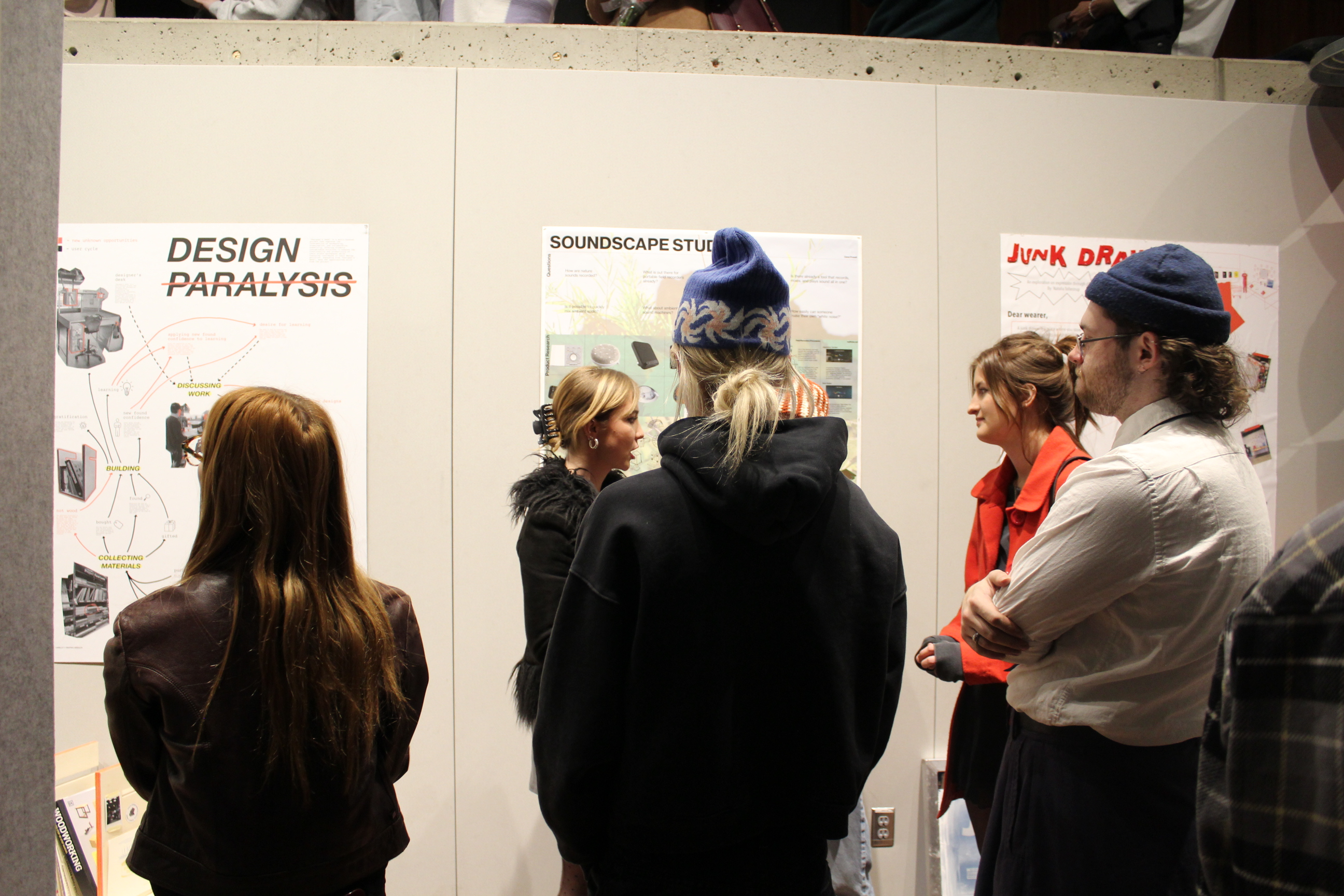
Multi-Disciplinary Design Students at a showcase

The Department of Architecture was organized in 1949 within the College of Fine Arts, and authorized to grant the Bachelor of Architecture and Master of Architecture degrees. The program received initial NAAB accreditation in 1954, and has been accredited continuously since. Roger Bailey, FAIA, developed the program and served as head of the department from 1949-63. Bailey brought a variety of young faculty members to Utah, including Charles Moore, Gordon Heck, and James Acland.

In 1963, Robert L. Bliss, FAIA, was appointed head, and then served as dean from 1974-86. In 1967, in the forefront of many schools of architecture nationally, the school chose to offer the (three year +) Master of Architecture as the primary professional degree. The Bachelor of Architecture degree was discontinued in 1972 and no undergraduate major in architecture was offered. In 1974 the Department of Architecture became a separate academic unit, the Graduate School of Architecture (GSA), operating as a college within the university system.

In 1970 the GSA moved into its new building, a fine example of "brutalist" architecture by the local firm of Edwards and Daniels Architects. This facility continues to successfully house the program. In 1969, through the joint sponsorship of the school and the Utah Society of the American Institute of Architects, ASSIST, Inc., an independent, non-profit community design center was founded. In the early 1970s the school installed its first data processing unit, under the directorship of emeritus professor Edward “Ted” Smith, FAIA, making it among the first schools in the country to begin experimenting with computer applications in architecture.

In 1986, Carl Inoway, AIA, was appointed dean, and served until 1992. During this period, the school re-examined its degree offerings, due in part to the length of time it took to complete the program, lack of flexibility for differing student interests, and decreasing enrollments. The decision was made to seek approval to offer an undergraduate pre-professional degree, creating a 4+2 professional degree program to be offered in addition to the existing 3+ professional degree program.

William C. Miller, FAIA, was named dean in 1992. The School experienced a significant increase in student numbers from 1990 to 2000, at which time the enrollment was stabilized in both its undergraduate and graduate programs, with pre-professional and graduate majors limited to about 180 students total. Dean Miller also stabilized the funding of the school, in part by successfully instituting differential tuition and program fees, and in part through increases in the firm-sponsored scholarship program. The successful design-build program began in 1999. Dean Miller offered the architecture school a national presence through his activities with ACSA, AIA, NAAB and NCARB.

Brenda Case Scheer, FAIA, AICP, was named dean in 2002, and served until 2014. Her tenure has been marked by significant change in the college. Most obvious is the addition of the urban planning program and the subsequent change in name from the Graduate School of Architecture to the College of Architecture + Planning. Coupled with the retirement of several key design faculty members, and the addition of nine new faculty (five in design), this change has had significant impact on the offerings and emphasis in the architecture program and its visibility in the region. During her tenure the Multi-Disciplinary Design Program was created within the School of Architecture.

Keith Diaz Moore was appointed in 2014 following a national search. Dean Diaz Moore has established the core commitments in the vision of the college including: Responsibility, Respect, Resilience and Response. His unique focus on and ethic of care, empathy, health in the built environment and research in the built environment has allowed the college to address the pressing challenges of the 21st century in society and the environment.

Dean Arnab Chakraborty joined the college as a college professor of city and metropolitan planning and current dean in June 2023. As a leader in higher education, Chakraborty is committed to supporting the next generation of architects, designers, gamers and planners, and works to advance the teaching, research, and public engagement mission of the University of Utah. Previously, Chakraborty was an associate dean and a professor of urban and regional planning at the University of Illinois at Urbana-Champaign where his work helped develop new guidelines for recognizing significant and sustained community engagement. Chakraborty's focus on academic success and overall wellness of students, as well as ensuring curriculum and research are ever growing lead the college in establishing student's knowledge for professional preparation.

In 2022, the College of Architecture built homes for the Navajo Nation in San Juan County.
