= 2025 Ammodo Architecture Awards =

2nd annual Ammodo Architecture Awards

- Awarded for: Advance socially and ecologically responsible architecture worldwide
- Date: November 13, 2025
- Website: ammodo-architecture.org

The 2025 Ammodo Architecture Awards, held on November 13, are the second edition of the Ammodo Architecture Awards, established by Stichting Ammodo. The awards aim to advance socially and ecologically responsible architecture worldwide.

In this edition, 26 architectural projects were selected from 168 submissions across more than 60 countries, recognizing practices ranging from grassroots collectives to established studios. Winners were awarded grants between €10,000 and €150,000, categorized under Local Scale, Social Engagement, and Social Architecture.

== Jury ==
The 2025 jury cycle comprised Joumana El Zein Khoury, Andrés Jaque, Anupama Kundoo, Floris Alkemade, Mariam Issoufou, and Loreta Castro Reguera, while the ambassadors network included Alejandro Echeverri, Amit Gupta, Aric Chen, Caroline Pidcock, Carson Chan, Christele Harrouk, Daan Roggeveen, Dan Hill, Davina Rooney, Dirk Hebel, Elizabeth Pigou-Dennis, Ethan Kent, Geeta Mehta, Malu Borja López, Mateja Kurir, May al-Ibrashy, Naomi Hoogervorst, Nicolas Valencia, Patti Anahory, and Tau Tavengwa.

== Awards ==
=== Local Scale ===
Self-initiated socially and ecologically oriented spatial projects that have a local impact.

Author(s)	Project	Country
Espacio Común	Main Stage of MuyunaFest	Peru
Robida Collective	Village as House	Italy
Terrachidia NGO	Terrachidia Oasis Campus	Morocco
Gladiola Camacho Estudio	Jardín Naturalista Colibrí	Mexico
Laboraterra Arquitetura + Alain Briatte Mantchev Arquitetura	Jucão Seed House	Brazil
Karlsruhe Institute of Technology	TerraTimber	Germany
Esfahk Mud Center	Adobe Vault	Iran
Dhammada Collective	Rural Primary School in Mandi	India
Sustainable Mountain Architecture	Bankatta Community Initiative	Nepal
AHS CxA	Magdy El Khouly Street Renovation	Egypt
WM Re-Lab	Play–Pause–Ponder	Pakistan
1to1 – Agency of Engagement	The Slovo Hall Project	South Africa

=== Social Engagement ===
Talented architects to take the next step in pursuing socially and ecologically responsible architecture.

Author(s)	Project	Country
LUO Studio	Zheshui Natural Library	China
Limbo Accra	Limbo Museum	Ghana
La Cabina de la Curiosidad	Chaki Wasi	Ecuador
Aziza Chaouni Projects	Prototype Anti-Seismic House	Morocco
Shidhulai Swanirvar Sangstha	Floating Schools for Community Resilience	Bangladesh
atArchitecture + Anant Foundation	Jackfruit Processing Unit and Community Centre	India
Floating EV	Floating University	Germany
o+h	Shelter Inclusive Place COPAL	Japan
Urban Rivers	The Wild Mile	United States
NMBW Architecture Studio	Sanders Place	Australia
Paraa	Machan_Korail Community Platform	Bangladesh
Asociación Semillas para el Desarrollo Sostenible	Territorio de los Saberes – Mencoriari	Peru

=== Social Architecture ===
Outstanding architects are rewarded for building responsible architecture that is both socially and ecologically excellent.

Author(s)	Project	Country
SHAU	Kampung Mrican Phase 1	Indonesia
gaupenraub+/-	VinziRast am Land	Austria
