= 2024 Ammodo Architecture Awards =

1st annual Ammodo Architecture Awards

- Awarded for: Advance socially and ecologically responsible architecture worldwide
- Date: November 19, 2024
- Website: ammodo-architecture.org

The 2024 Ammodo Architecture Awards are the inaugural edition of the Ammodo Architecture Awards, established by Stichting Ammodo. The awards aim to advance socially and ecologically responsible architecture worldwide.

The eligibility period included projects completed or under construction between January 2020 and December 2023.

The awardees are recognized across three categories: Social Architecture, Social Engagement, and Local Scale.

== Jury ==
The 2024 jury cycle comprised Joumana El Zein Khoury, Andrés Jaque, Anupama Kundoo, Floris Alkemade, and Mariam Issoufou while the ambassadors network included Alejandro Echeverri, Carson Chan, Aric Chen, Daan Roggeveen, Dan Hill, Davina Rooney, Dirk Hebel, Elizabeth Pigou-Dennis, Ethan Kent, Geeta Mehta, Malu Borja López, Mateja Kurir, May al-Ibrashy, Naomi Hoogervorst, Nicolás Valencia, Patti Anahory.

== Awards ==
=== Local Scale ===
Self-initiated socially and ecologically oriented spatial projects that have a local impact.

Author(s)	Project	Country
Asiye eTafuleni	Warwick Junction Brook Street Child Care Facility	South Africa
CACP/YIIIE Architects	Community Art Creative Project (CACP)	China
Chaal.Chaal.Agency	Designing (In)Constant Infrastructures	India
Studio Chahar	Gouron Museum Community Trail	Iran
Ad Urbis	Meeting Place for Urban Pedagogy	Cuba
Cooperativa CIMBRA	Community Added Value Center	Argentina
Colectivo Aula Viva	Jardin Maloka	Colombia
Alsar-Atelier + Oscar Zamora	Community Fog Catcher Prototype	Colombia
Habitable	10th of July Family Group's Community Hub	Peru

=== Social Engagement ===
Talented architects to take the next step in pursuing socially and ecologically responsible architecture.

Author(s)	Project	Country
Outros Bairros Initiative	Outros Bairros Initiative	Cape Verde
StudioPOD	One Green Mile	India
Decoratelier Jozef Wouters	FLOW by POOL IS COOL	Belgium
Falk Schneemann Architektur FSA	Living above Garages	Germany
Natrufied Architecture	Wooncoöperatie De Warren	Netherlands
Studio Propolis	Bronwen's Sanctuary	United Kingdom
IAMÍ Institute	Architecture in the Periphery	Brazil
Estúdio Flume	Reference Centre for Babassu Coconut Harvesters	Brazil
Duque Motta & AA and MAPAA	Pivadenco Rural School	Chile
Puente + COONVITE	Forest of Memory	Colombia
RAMA estudio	Sustainable Alleys	Ecuador
Natura Futura + Juan Carlos Bamba	Las Tejedoras	Ecuador

=== Social Architecture ===
Outstanding architects by rewarding excellent socially and ecologically responsible architecture.

Author(s)	Project	Country
Yamazaki Kentaro Design Workshop	Long House with an Engawa	Japan
Lacol	La Balma	Spain
