= Architextiles =

Textile-based architectural assemblages

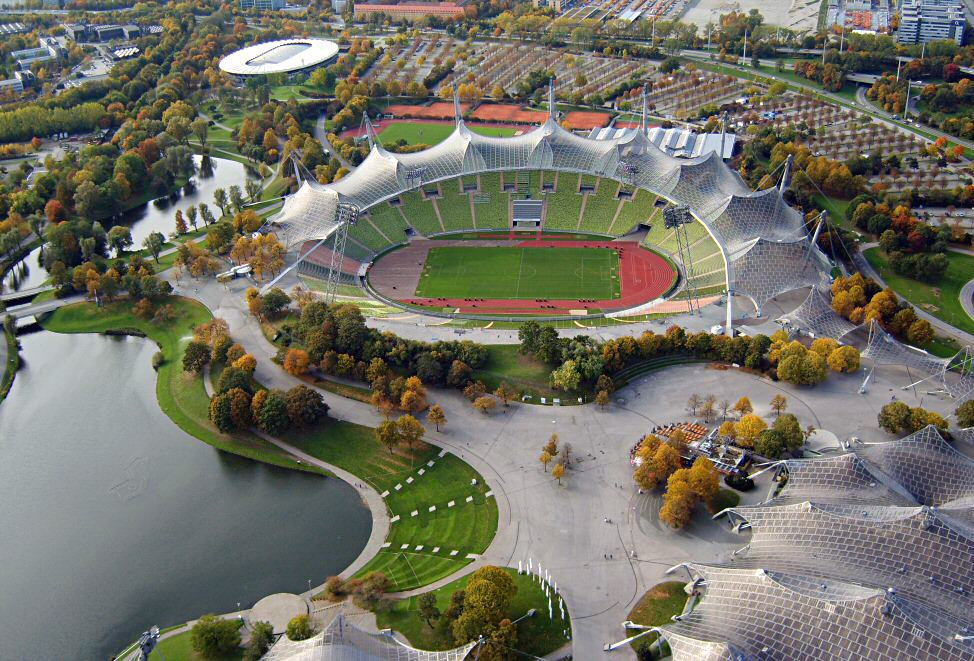
The Olympiastadion in Munich makes extensive use of tensile roofing structures.

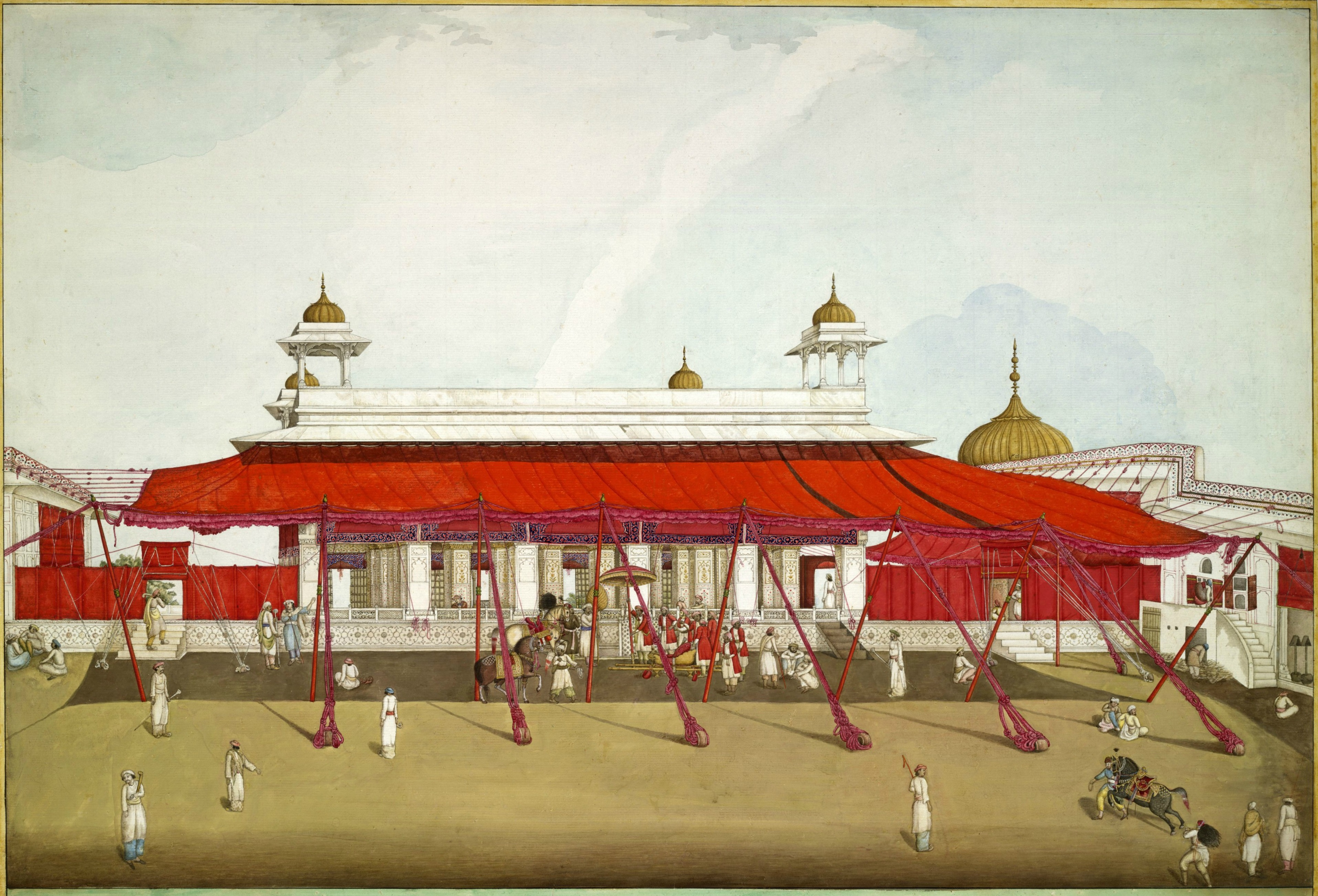
Diwan-i-Khas, Red Fort, Delhi with red awnings or shamianas, in 1817

Model of the Colosseum with its velarium in the Museum of Roman Civilization

Architextiles refers to a broad range of projects and approaches that combine architecture, textiles, and materials science. Architextiles explore textile-based approaches and inspirations for creating structures, spaces, surfaces, and textures. Architextiles contribute to the creation of adaptable, interactive, and process-oriented spaces. Awning is the most basic type of architectural textile. In Roman times, a velarium was used as an awning to cover the entire cavea, the seating area within amphitheaters, serving as protection for the spectators against the sun.

Hylozoic Ground, on the other hand, is a modern and complex architextile example. Hylozoic Ground is an interactive architecture model presented in the 18th Biennale of Sydney. Olympiastadion is another example of modern architecture presented in an unusual way.

== Etymology ==
Architextiles is a portmanteau word of textiles and architecture. 'Technology' and 'Textiles' both are derivation of a Latin language word texere that means 'construct' or 'weave'.Textiles is also among derivative words of the Ancestor of the Indo-European language word "tek" which is the root to architecture.

== Architecture and textiles ==
=== Architectural textiles ===
Architextiles is the architecture that is inspired by characteristics, elements, and manufacturing techniques of textiles. It is a field that spans multiple disciplines. It is a combination of textile and architectural manufacturing techniques. Laser cutting, ultrasonic welding, thermoplastic setting, pultrusion, electrospinning, and other advanced textile manufacturing techniques are all included in architextiles. Architextiles integrate various fields like architecture, textile design, engineering, physics and materials science.

=== Textile inspirations ===
Architextiles exploits the sculptural potential of textile-based structures. Textiles motivate architects with their numerous features, enabling them to express ideas via design and create environmentally conscious buildings. Textiles also influence architecture in the following ways:

==== Characteristics ====
Textiles are adaptable, lightweight, and useful for a variety of structures, both temporary and permanent. Tensile surfaces composed of structural fabrics, such as canopies, roofs, and other types of shelter, are included in architectural textiles. If necessary, the subjected materials are given special purpose finishes, such as waterproofing, to make them suitable for outdoor use.

Besides surface qualities, such as rough and smooth, dull and shiny, hard and soft, textiles also includes colour, and, as the dominating element, texture, which is the result of the construction of weaves. Like any craft it may end in producing useful objects, or it may rise to the level of art.

— Anni Albers,

The essentially structural principles that relate the work of building and weaving could form the basis of a new understanding between the architect and the inventive weaver. New uses of fabrics and new fabrics could result from a collaboration; and textiles, so often no more than an after thought in planning, might take a place again as a contributing thought.

— Anni Albers,

==== Coated fabrics ====
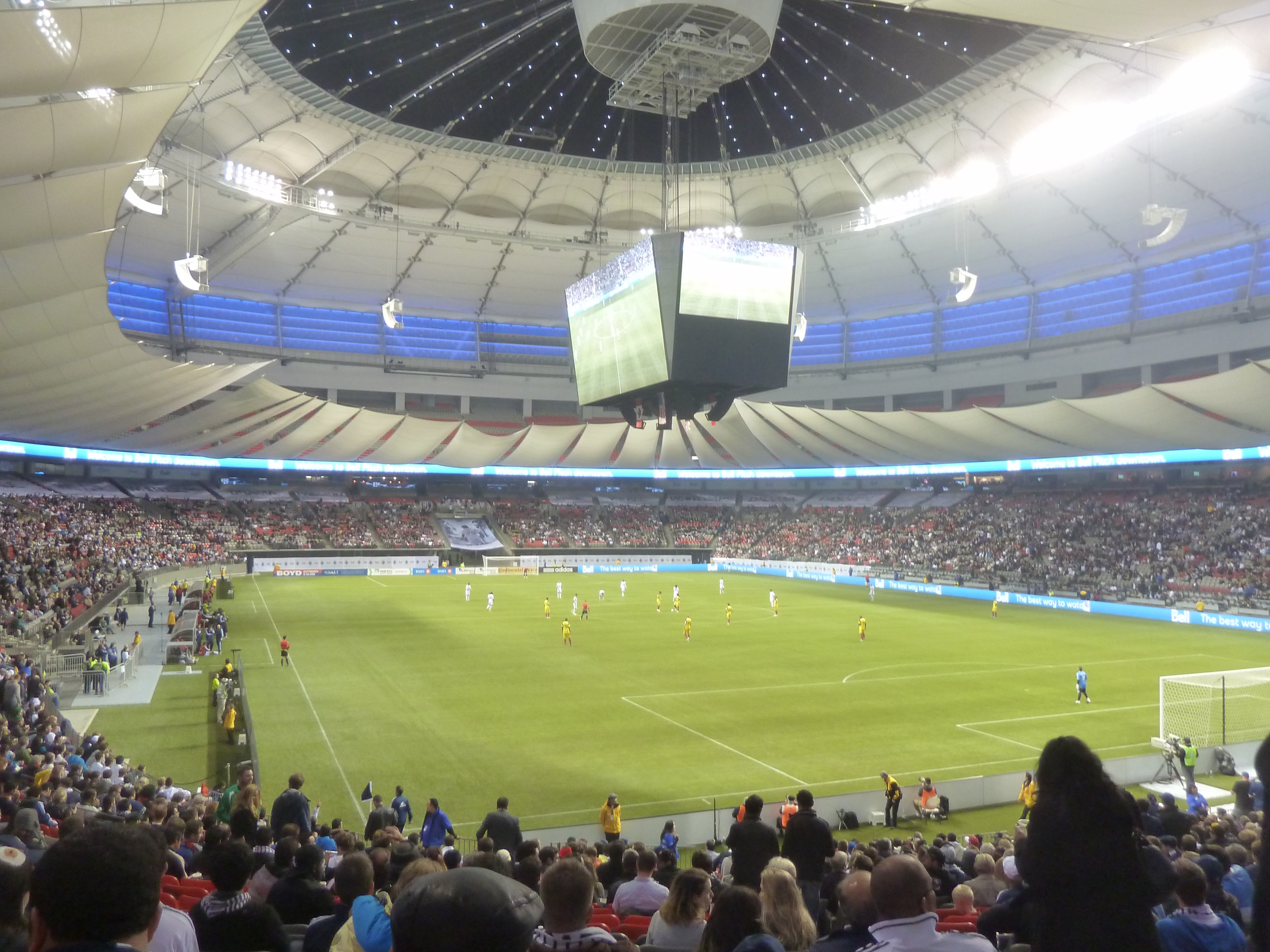
Air supported structure BC Place

There is considerable use of coated materials in certain architectures, Pneumatic structures are made of teflon or PVC-coated synthetic materials. Coated fiberglass, coated polyethylene and coated polyester are the most common materials used in lightweight structural textiles. Lightweight fabric constructions accounted for 13.2 square yards of total usage in 2006, according to Industrial Fabrics Association International (IFAI) Chemically inert, Polytetrafluoroethylene fibreglass coating is capable of withstanding temperatures as low as −100 °F (−73 °C) and as high as +450 °F (232 °C).

==== Interactive textiles ====
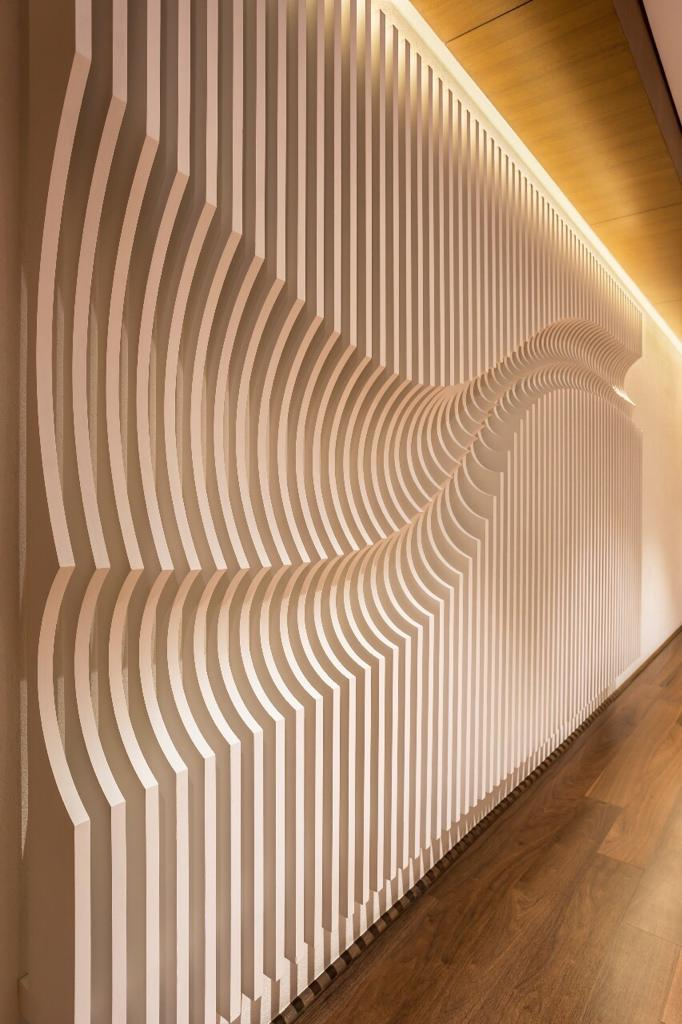
Parametric design

Textiles that can sense stimuli are known as interactive textiles. They have the capability to adapt or react to the environment. Felecia Davis has designed interactive textiles such as parametric tents that are able to change size and shape in response to changes in light and the number of people underneath.

==== 3D structures ====
Soundproof 3D woven walls with a ribbed structure that are suitable for soundproofing and interior designing. Aleksandra Gaca designed the furnishing of the concept car Renault Symbioz with a 3D fabric named 'boko'.

===== Origami-inspired textiles =====
Textiles inspired by origami impart novel properties to architecture. Architects try out origami and three-dimensional fabric structures when designing structures.

== History ==
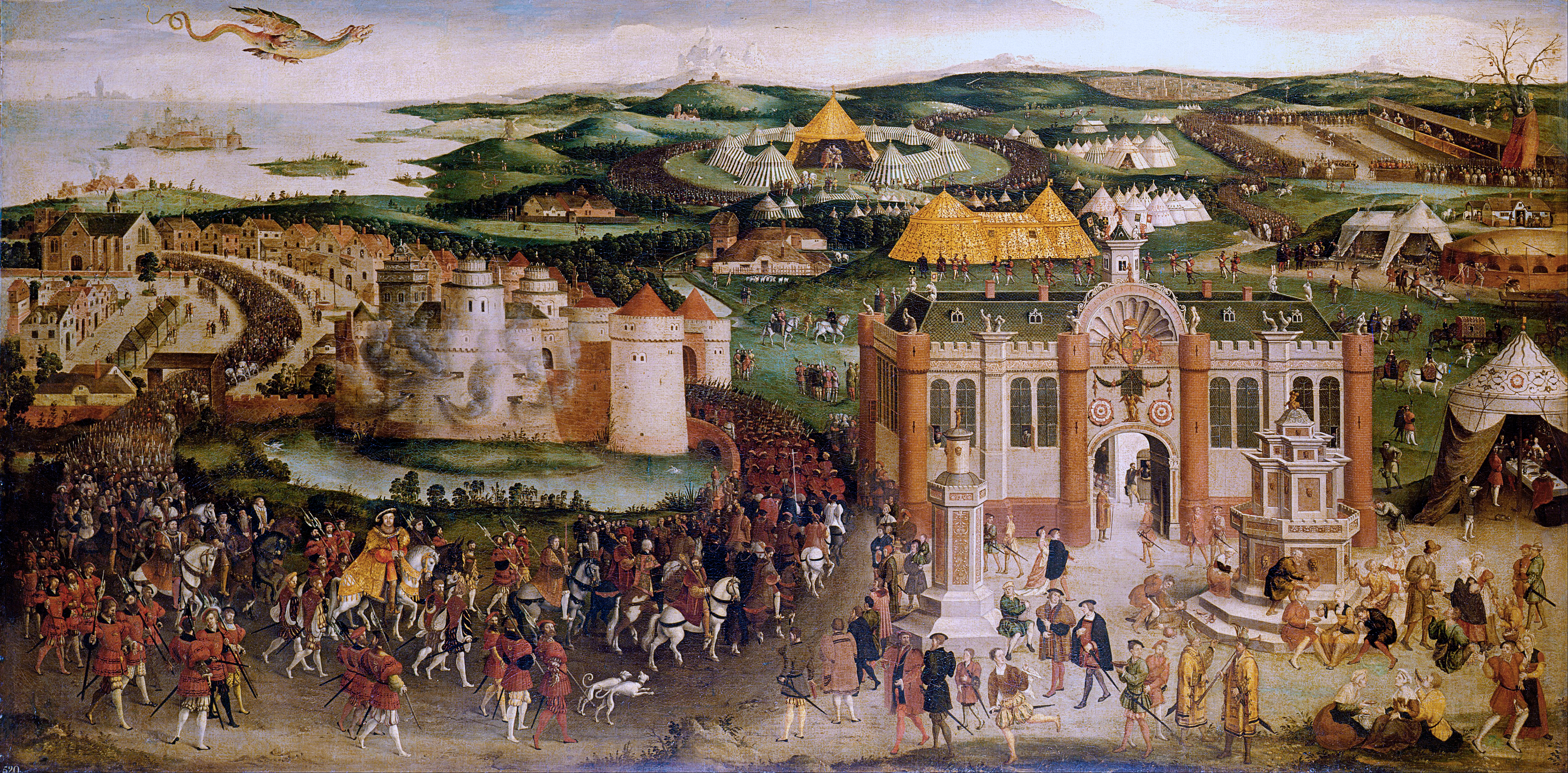
The Field of the Cloth of Gold, oil painting of circa 1545 in the Royal Collection at Hampton Court. Henry VIII on horseback approaches at bottom left.

Examples of architextiles have been found dating back a long way. Over centuries, nomadic tribes in the Middle East, Africa, the Orient, and the Americas have developed textile structures.

=== Historical structures ===
Historical architextiles include yurts and tents, the great awnings of Colosseum in Rome, the tents of the Mongol Empire, and the Ziggurat Aquar Quf near Baghdad.

== Present ==
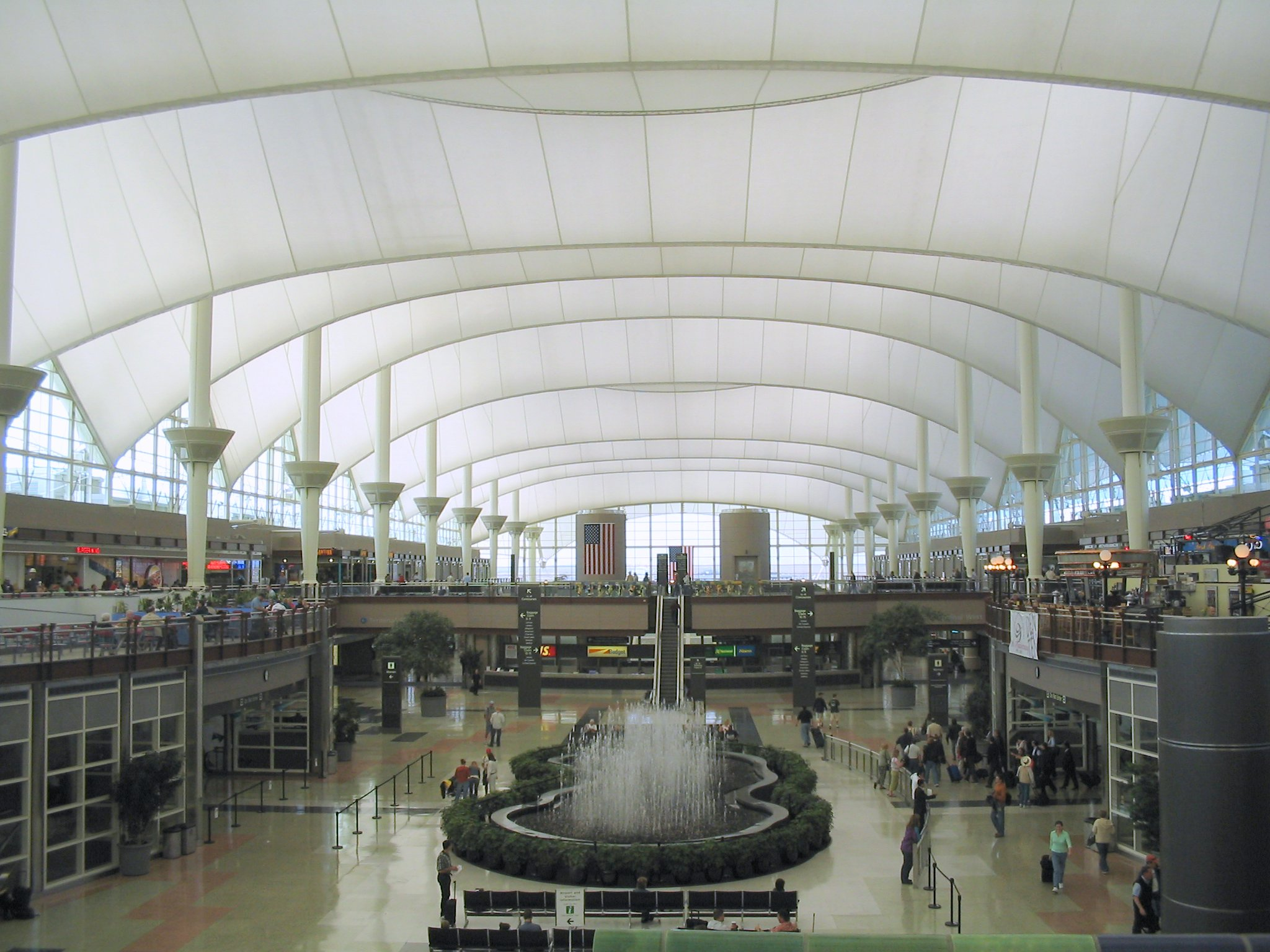
Denver International Airport terminal

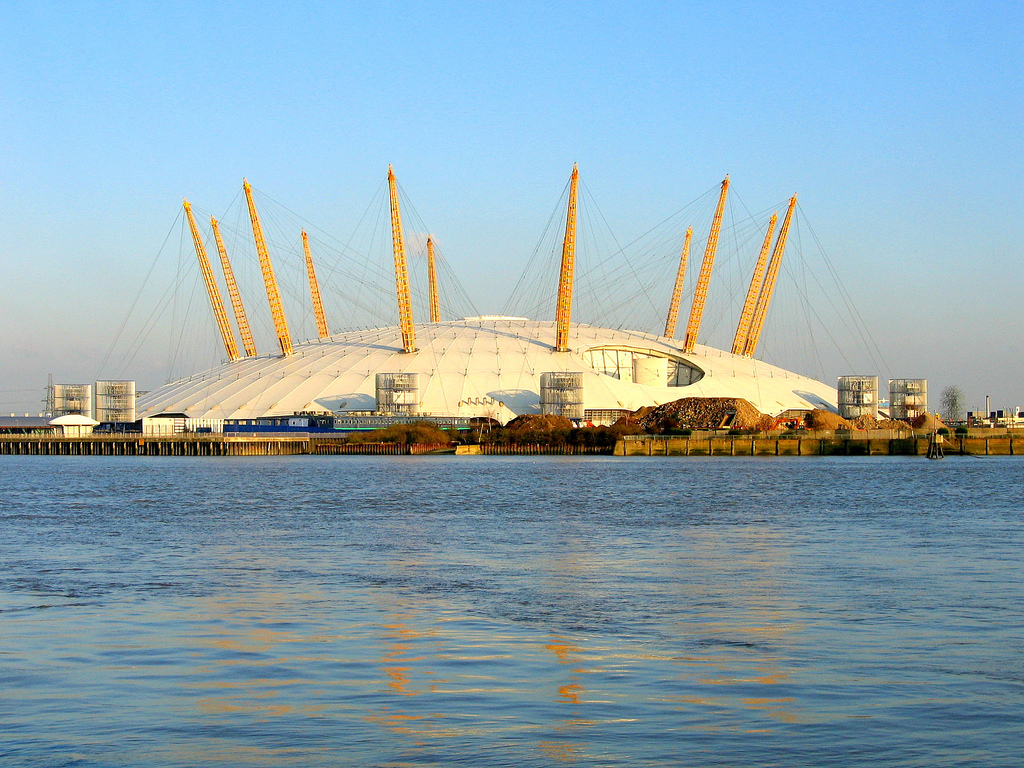
Millennium Dome

=== Properties ===
Architextiles have a number of advantages; primarily, they are cost effective and can be used to construct temporary or transportable structures. The programming can be modified at any time.

=== Examples of architextiles ===
==== Muscle NSA ====
NSA Muscle, is a pressurized (Inflatable body) structure which is an interactive model. It is equipped with sensors and computing systems, the MUSCLE is programmed to respond to human visitors.

==== Carbon tower ====
The carbon tower is a prototype carbon fiber building.

==== Hylozoic Ground ====
Hylozoic Ground is an exemplar of live architecture, interactive model of architecture which is a kind of architextiles.

==== Textile growth monument ====
Textile growth monument ‘textielgroeimonument’ is a 3D 'woven' structure in the city Tilburg.

==== Pneumatrix ====
Pneumatrix, RCA Department of Architecture, London, a theatre which is deployable and flexible.

== See also ==
- 3D textiles
- Maison folie de Wazemmes
- Lars Spuybroek
- Tent
- Wearable technology
