= Uzma Z. Rizvi =

Archaeologist and researcher

Uzma Rizvi
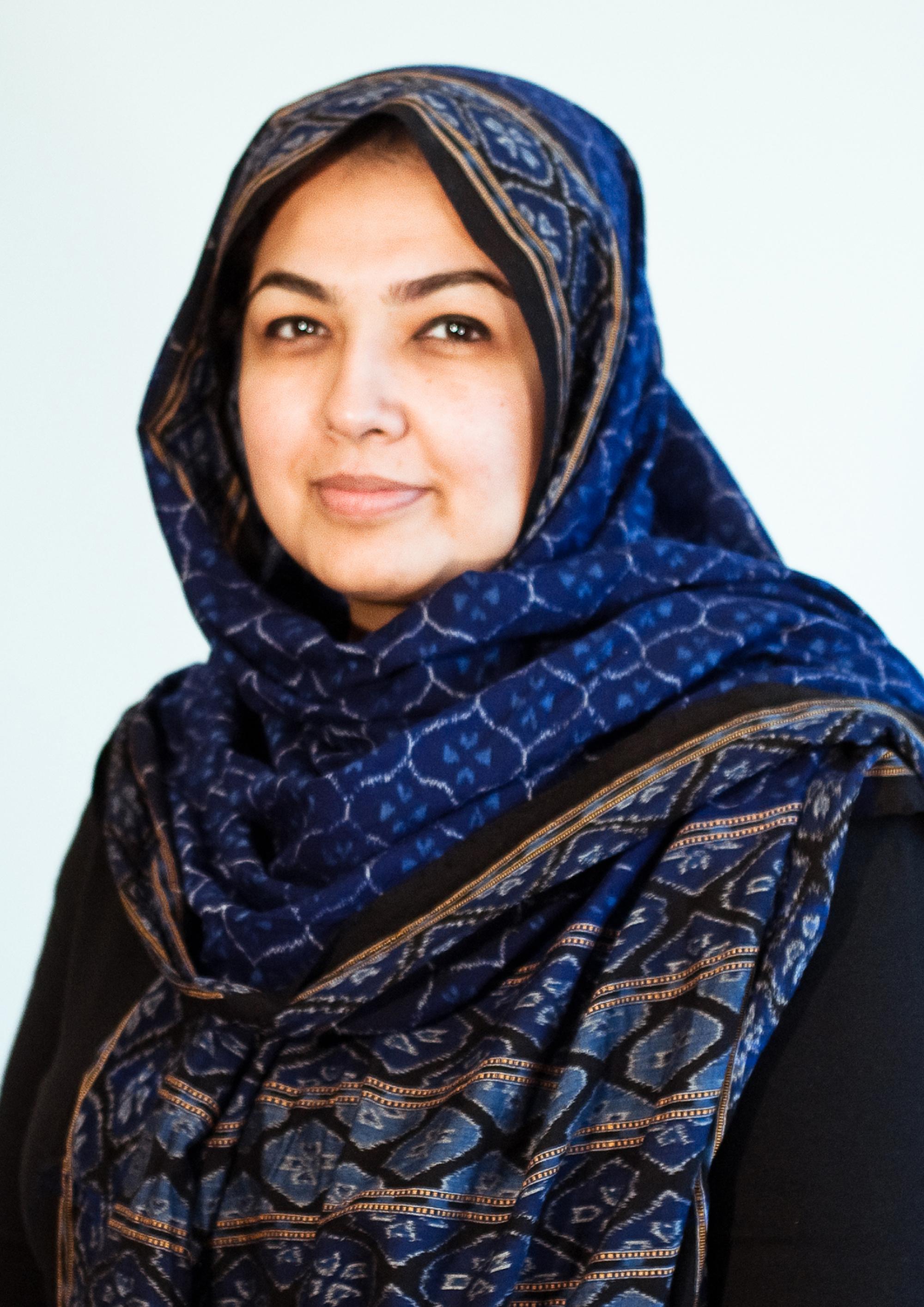
- Occupation: Archaeologist

Academic background
- Education: Bryn Mawr College; University of Pennsylvania

Academic work
- Institutions: Pratt Institute

Uzma Z. Rizvi is an American archaeologist and Professor of Anthropology and Urban Studies at Pratt Institute and a visiting scholar at Shah Abdul Latif University, Khairpur, Pakistan, where she teaches decolonial archaeology, ancient urbanism, critical heritage studies, new materialism, and the postcolonial critique. Her primary research centers on Ancient Pakistan and the United Arab Emirates during the third millennium BCE.

== Education ==
Rizvi graduated with a Bachelor of Arts (BA) degree in Classical and Near Eastern Archaeology from Bryn Mawr College in 1995 and received her Doctor of Philosophy (PhD) degree in Anthropology from the Department of Anthropology, University of Pennsylvania in 2007. Her Doctoral Dissertation was based on her 2000 and 2003 survey work in Rajasthan.

== Research ==
Rizvi's research centers on third millennium BCE Ancient Pakistan and the United Arab Emirates with a primary focus of ancient subjectivity, intimate architecture, critical heritage studies at the intersections of contemporary art and history, and epistemological critiques of the discipline in the service of decolonization. Her work critiques archaeological epistemologies and methodologies, and argues for a changed praxis based on decolonized principles and participatory ethics.

Her research has been supported by Fulbright–Hays DDRA, the George F. Dales Foundation, the American Institute of Pakistan Studies (AIPS), and the Mellon Foundation, among others.

== Career ==
=== Academic and Professional Appointments ===
From 2006 to 2008, Rizvi was an adjunct professor at Pratt Institute in the department of Social Science and Cultural Studies. She was a Postdoctoral Fellow at Stanford University from 2008 to 2009, after which she returned to Pratt as an assistant professor. From 2014 to 2019 she was a visiting scholar at the American University of Sharjah, UAE, and a lead tutor for Campus Art Dubai from 2014 to 2020. In 2015, she became an associate professor at Pratt.

Rizvi was the Anthropology chair for the New York Academy of Sciences from 2019 to 2021. In 2022 she was awarded a year-long Archaeological Institute of America Joukowsky Lectureship.

Since 2022, Rizvi has served as the President of the Pratt Institute Academic Senate.

=== Archaeological Projects ===
==== Past Work ====
Beginning in 1997, Rizvi was a trench supervisor for projects across Pakistan, India, Syria, and Pennsylvania. In 2000 she was the Principal Investigator (PI) of the Ganeshwar Jodhpura Cultural Complex Survey in Rajasthan, India, a role she returned to in 2003.

In 2009, Rizvi embarked on a visit to Iraq, an experience she credits with making her an archaeologist. When told government checkpoint locations were in constant flux as a military strategy to prevent attacks and reshape urban dynamics by “fracturing” the neighborhood, she began to generate a mental archaeological survey as a protective measure. She recalled “I looked at the post holes, because each of these tents leave very deep marks… I looked at the kerosene lamps [and] kerosene marks on the ground: the darker the ash, the more recent the movement. In order to take care of my body, I became an archeologist.”

Rizvi was the PI for the 2012 Eastern UAE: Archaeological Reconnaissance project, as well as the 2013 Eastern UAE: Cultural Reconnaissance project. From 2016 to 2019, Rizvi was PI of The UAE Coastal Archaeological and Heritage Project (UAE-CAHP).

==== The Laboratory for Integrated Archaeological Visualization and Heritage ====
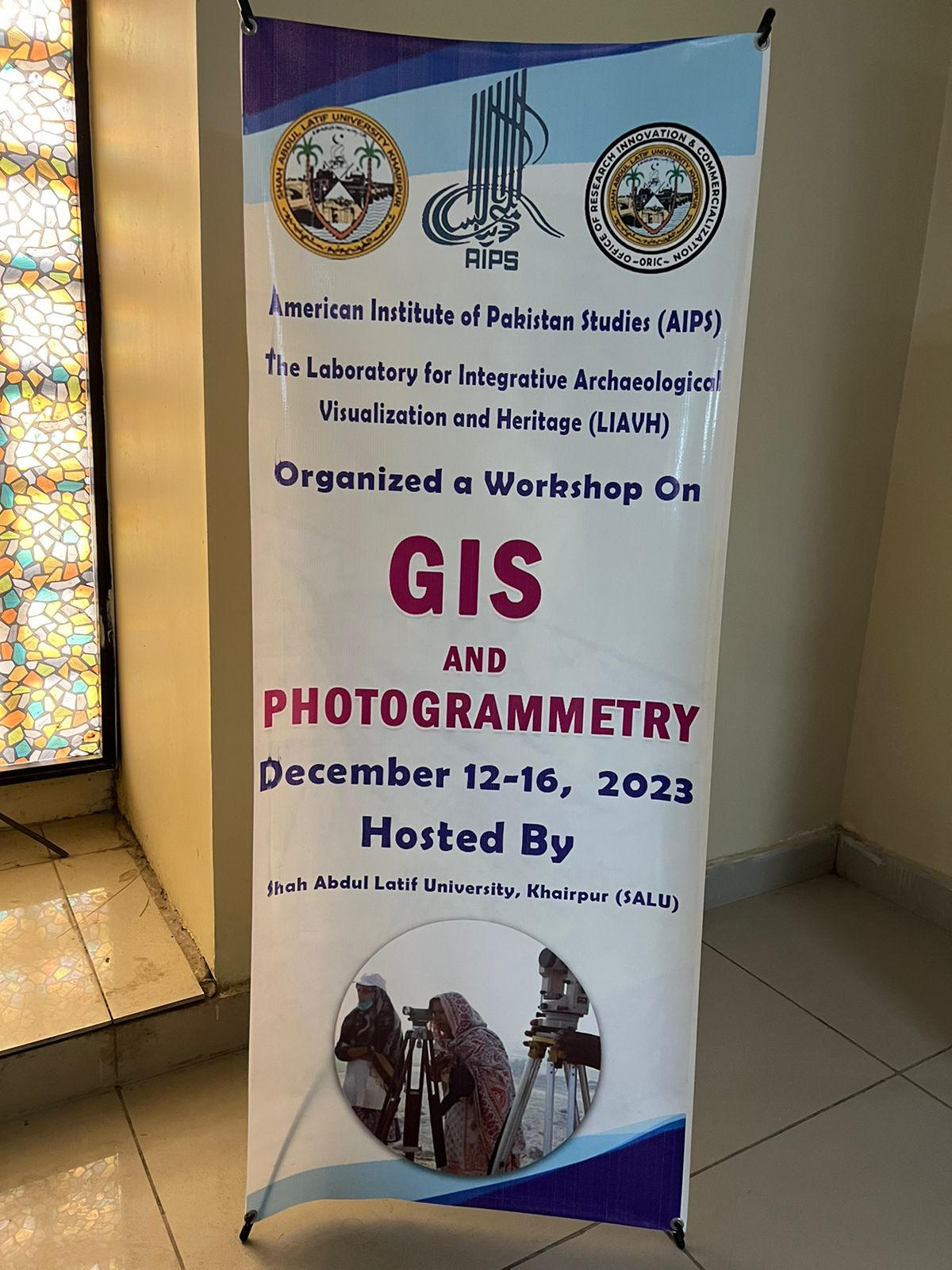
A banner for a GIS and Photogrammetry Workshop organized by the American Institute of Pakistan Studies (AIPS) and LIAVH. Hosted by Shah Abdul Latif University in Khaipur, Pakistan.

Rizvi is the Director of the Laboratory for Integrated Archeological Visualization and Heritage (LIAVH), an interdisciplinary institution that forges connections between technology; archaeological data management; and heritage practice. She founded LIAVH to utilize non-invasive forms of data collection in order to develop data visualization tools that enable spatial and temporal research. The research she oversees is intentionally feminist, anticolonial, and antiracist; with the goal of correcting the colonial lens with new archaeological data interpretation.

M-LAB is Rizvi's inaugural project under LIAVH, connecting multidimensional archaeological data to detailed 3D site models for the 3rd millennium BCE, UNESCO World Heritage Site of Mohenjo-daro, Pakistan. This project utilizes technologies like GIS and photogrammetry that allows for visualization of multiple strata, artifacts, and architecture through time, enabling researchers to analyze ancient cities from an urban planning perspective.

=== Art and Cultural Production ===
==== Art Dubai Global Art Forum ====
Alongside artist and curator Amal Khalaf, Rizvi co-directed the 2016 Art Dubai Global Art Forum 10, which mediated on the theme "The Future Was." The forum explored the ways in which artists, writers, technologists, historians, musicians and thinkers have imagined, and are shaping, the future. The event included performance, music, commissioned research and projects alongside live talks.

Rizvi taught a contingent of students for the cognate Campus Art Dubai program, a school for artists, curators, writers, architects, designers and cultural producers based in the UAE. The Core Program took on the theme “Turbulent Waters, Shifting Sands.” Course material, workshops, lectures, critiques and seminars explored what it means to exist in the fluid geographies and topographies of the region, while challenging participants’ fixed notions of borders, identity, architecture, urban development and trade. The course culminated with Art Dubai Global Art Forum 10.

==== Fikra Graphic Design Biennale ====
Rizvi was the Director of "The Department of Mapping Margins" at the 2018 inaugural Fikra Graphic Design Biennale in which she evoked the future of critical design while providing strategies to decenter and decolonize disciplinary lines of control. By focusing on the margins, the department illustrated the ways by which there is a fluidity, openness and criticality to the ways by which contemporary graphic designers test and realign those lines. This took place as a series of communal feasts, conversations, and pedagogical experiments which included a pop-up shop and musical performances.

==== Venice Architecture Biennale ====
Alongside Murtaza Vali, Rizvi curated the National Pavilion of Saudi Arabia at the 17th Venice Architecture Biennale, featuring Studio Bound architects Hussam Dakkak, Basmah Kaki, and Hessa AlBader. Entitled Accommodations, this exhibition reflected on the theme of "How Will We Live Together?" through the lens of historical and contemporary quarantine during the COVID-19 pandemic. The Pavilion was presented as an experiential exhibition rooted in archival research. Envisioned as several spaces within a space, the three-part exhibition invited visitors into the realms of quarantine through which they could explore the intertwining relationship between inclusion and exclusion. The exhibition examined the evolution of enclosures as they respond to external contexts, derive new meanings from novel situations, and redefine the relationship between the individual, the community and the other.

==== Filmography ====
In 2007, Rizvi directed the documentary "Telling Stories, Constructing Narratives: Gender Equity in Archaeology." She was featured in the 2018 PBS documentary miniseries, First Civilizations, speaking about Mohenjo-daro and urban planning.

== Select publications ==
=== Monographs ===
- Rizvi, U. Z. 2018. The Affect of Crafting: Third Millennium BCE Copper Arrowheads from Ganeshwar, Rajasthan, ArcheoPress, London.

=== Edited volumes ===
- Rizvi, U.Z., L. Weiss and W. Londono 2014. (section eds) Political and Social Archaeology, The Encyclopedia of Global Archaeology. Springer Publication.
- Abraham, S., P.Gullapalli, T. Raczek and U.Z. Rizvi 2013. (eds) Connections and Complexity: New Approaches to the Archaeology of South Asia, Walnut Creek, CA: Left Coast Press.
- Lydon, J. and U.Z. Rizvi 2010. (eds) World Archaeological Congress Research Handbook on Postcolonial Archaeology, Walnut Creek, CA: Left Coast Press.
- Liebmann, M. and U.Z. Rizvi. 2008. (eds) Archaeology and the Postcolonial Critique, Walnut Creek, CA: Altamira Press.

=== Journal Articles ===
- Rizvi, U. Z. 2022. Community engagement in archaeology and heritage in Pakistan. Introduction to Special issue on Community Engagement in Archaeology and Heritage of Pakistan. 9 (1): 1–8. Journal of Community Archaeology and Heritage.
- Rizvi, U.Z. 2020. Heritage Practice: The politics of Race/Gender/Sexuality. Commentary for ‘Engendering Heritage: Contemporary Feminist Approaches to Archaeological Heritage,’ edited by Tiffany C. Cain and Teresa P. Raczek. Archaeological Papers for the American Association of Anthropology. Washington DC: American Association of Anthropology.
- Rizvi, U. Z. 2019. Archaeological Encounters: The Role of the Speculative in Decolonial Archaeology. Special issue on Archaeology and Futurity, edited by Matthew Reilly. Journal of Contemporary Archaeology. Volume 6 (1): 154–167.
- Rizvi, U. Z. 2006. Accounting for Multiple Desires: Decolonizing Methodologies, Archaeology and the Public Interest, India Review, Vol. 5 (3–4): 394–416.

=== Book Chapters ===
- Rizvi, U. Z. 2020. Community Based and Participatory Praxis as Decolonizing Archaeological Methods, and the Betrayal of New Research. Archaeologies of Emotion, edited by Sonya Atalay, Jane Baxter, Natasha Lyons, and Kisha Supernant. pp. 83–96. Springer.
- Rizvi, U. Z. 2018. Archaeological Projects in India: Decolonizing archaeological research, assessing success, and valuing failure. Engaging Archaeological Research: Case Studies in Method, Theory, and Practice, edited by Stephen Silliman. pp. 41–49. Wiley-Blackwell.
- Rizvi, U. Z. 2016. Decolonization as Care. Slow Reader: A Resource for Design Thinking and Practice, edited by Carolyn F. Strauss and Ana Paula Pais. A SlowLab Collaboration with Valiz. pp. 85–95. Amsterdam, Valiz Publishers.
- Rizvi, U. Z. 2013. Checkpoints as Gendered Spaces: An autoarchaeology of War, Heritage and the city, in The Oxford Handbook of the Archaeology of the Contemporary World, edited by P. Graves- Brown, R. Harrison, and A. Piccini, pp. 494–506. Oxford: Oxford University Press.
- Rizvi, U. Z. 2013. Creating Prehistory and Protohistory: Constructing Otherness and Politics ofContemporary Indigenous Populations in India, in The Death of Prehistory, edited by P. Schmidt and S. Mrozowski. pp. 141–157. Oxford: Oxford University Press.
- Rizvi, U. Z. 2013. Crafting Communities and Producing Places: Copper, settlement patterns, and social identity in the Ganeshwar Jodhpura Cultural Complex, Rajasthan, India, in Connections and Complexity: New Approaches to the Archaeology of South Asia, edited by S. Abraham, P. Gullapalli, T. Raczek, and U. Rizvi, pp. 315–340. Walnut Creek, CA: Left Coast Press.
- Rizvi, U. Z. 2008. Decolonizing Methodologies as Strategies of Practice: Operationalizing the Postcolonial Critique in the Archaeology of Rajasthan, in Archaeology and the Postcolonial Critique, M. Liebmann and U. Rizvi (eds.), p. 109-127. Archaeology and Society Series, Walnut Creek, CA: Altamira Press.
- Rizvi, U. Z. 2011. Subjectivity and Spatiality in Indus Urban Forms: Mohenjo-Daro, the Body, and the Domestication of Waste, in The Archaeology of Politics: The Materiality of Political Practice and Action in the Past, edited by Peter G. Johansen and Andrew M. Bauer, pp. 221–244. Cambridge Scholars Press.

=== Encyclopedia Entries ===
- Rizvi, U.Z. 2023. Postcolonial/Anticolonial/Decolonial Archaeology. Entry for Encyclopedia of Archaeology, Second Edition. Elsevier Press.
- Rizvi, U.Z. 2012. Postcolonial Archaeology. Entry for The Oxford Companion to Archaeology, Second Edition. Oxford University Press.
- Rizvi, U.Z. 2005. City, History of; Copper Age; Gandhi, Mahatma; Women in Anthropology; Entries for Encyclopedia of Anthropology, edited by James Birx. London: Sage.
