= Philip Beesley =

Canadian Artist

Philip Beesley (born 1956) is a multidisciplinary artist, designer, and university professor. A practitioner of sculpture test beds and digital media art, his work is cited for his contributions to the field of responsive and interactive systems.

== Early life and education ==
Beesley received a B.F.A from Queen’s University and a B.Arch from the University of Toronto. He also holds a diploma in Architectural and Mechanical Drafting/Machining from Humber College. He has been a practicing visual artist since 1978.

He was a member of art and performance collaboratives Open Series and Studio Six/Kataraque in Kingston and the George Meteskey Ensemble in New York. Periods of study were undertaken in Rome at the Vatican and the American Academy and in New York with the Wooster Group. Prior to beginning his practice he apprenticed in instrument making and in lighting design. His focus on textile structures began in exchanges with members of the Toronto craft community and the Textile Museum of Canada during the 1990s. Exchanges with Philadelphia artist Warren Seelig from 1995 to 1998 introduced geotextiles as a class of engineering structures, reinforced by dialogues with Kenneth Snelson and Chuck Hoberman in 1998. At the University of Waterloo School of Architecture, Thoman Seebohm supported a focus on computational modeling during the late 1990s. Interactive systems were introduced by Diane Willow at the Haystack Mountain School of Crafts in 2002. Jim Ruxton, Steven Wood, and Robert Gorbet supported his learning of electronics and digital control systems during collaborations 2003-7.

== Career ==
Beesley was co-founder of the University of Waterloo Integrated Centre for Visualization, Design and Manufacturing in 2001. Beesley is currently a professor at the University of Waterloo School of Architecture and the European Graduate School. He serves as the director of the Living Architecture Systems Group (LASG) and director for Riverside Architectural Press. His Toronto-based practice, Philip Beesley Studio Inc., works in numerous collaborations, including long-standing exchanges with Iris van Herpen, Salvador Breed, Rob Gorbet, and Matt Gorbet.

Beesley's work has been exhibited at international cultural venues, including the Venice Biennale of Architecture with "Hylozoic Ground" and "Grove", the National Museum of Modern and Contemporary Art with "Epiphyte Chamber", the Royal Ontario Museum with "Aegis" and "Noosphere", the Isabella Stewart Gardner Museum with "Sentient Veil", and the San José International Airport with "Threshold".

== Awards and recognition ==
Beesley was inducted as a member of the Royal Canadian Academy of Arts in 2011 and is a Fellow of the Royal Architectural Institute of Canada.

He is the recipient of the Prix de Rome for Architecture, the ACADIA Award for Emerging Digital Practice, and the Canadian Architect Award of Excellence, among others.
