= Bartch =

Bartch is a surname. Notable people with the surname include:

- Ben Bartch (born 1998), American football player
- George W. Bartch (1849–1927), American judge
- Carl E. Bartch, a former spokesperson for the U.S. Department of State

== See also ==
- Barch
- Baruch (given name)
