= Aric Chen =

American curator

- Born: Chicago, Illinois, U.S.
- Education: University of California, Berkeley (BA, BArch); Parsons School of Design (MA)
- Occupations: Architecture curator, writer
- Employer(s): Het Nieuwe Instituut (2021-2024); Zaha Hadid Foundation (2025-)

Aric Chen is an American architecture curator and writer. In 2025, he was appointed director of the Zaha Hadid Foundation.

Previously, he served a four-year tenure as the general and artistic director of Het Nieuwe Instituut in the Netherlands, the national museum and archive for architecture, design, and digital culture.

== Biography ==
Born in Chicago, United States, to Taiwanese parents, Chen studied at the University of California, Berkeley, where he pursued a bachelor's degree in architecture and a bachelor's degree in anthropology. He then continued his studies at Cooper-Hewitt, Smithsonian Design Museum and the Parsons School of Design, where he earned a master's degree in history of design.

Before transitioning to curating, he worked as a journalist. In 2008, he relocated to China, where he served as a professor and the founding director of the Curatorial Lab at the College of Design & Innovation at Tongji University in Shanghai. In 2010, Chen was appointed the first Creative Director of the Beijing Design Week.

From 2012 to 2019, Chen was the founding lead curator for design and architecture at Hong Kong's visual culture museum, M+. There, he oversaw the establishment of the new museum's design and architecture collection and programme.

In 2018, Chen became the first curatorial director of the Design Miami events in Florida and Basel, Switzerland.

In 2021, he was appointed general and artistic director of Het Nieuwe Instituut, the Netherlands’ national museum and institute for architecture, design and digital culture, based in Rotterdam. Four years later, he served as an ambassador for the inaugural cycle of the Ammodo Architecture Awards.

In April 2025, he announced his resignation of his role at Het Nieuwe Instituut as he was appointed director of the Zaha Hadid Foundation.

Chen has frequently contributed to publications such as The New York Times, Wallpaper*, and Architectural Record. He has organized numerous projects and exhibitions internationally and has served on various juries. Additionally, he has been a curatorial adviser to events such as the Bi-City Biennale of Urbanism/Architecture, the Cooper-Hewitt Design Triennial, and the Gwangju Design Biennale.

== Exhibitions ==
- 2021: X is Not a Small Country: Unravelling the Post-Global Era. Museum of Art, Architecture, and Technology, Lisbon
- 2022-23: Urban Cosmologies. 9th Bi-City Biennale of Urbanism/Architecture
- 2023: Arata Isozaki: In Formation. Power Station of Art, Shanghai

== Publications ==
- 2016: Brazil Modern. The Monacelli Press, United States
