= Marta Maccaglia =

Italian architect (born 1983)

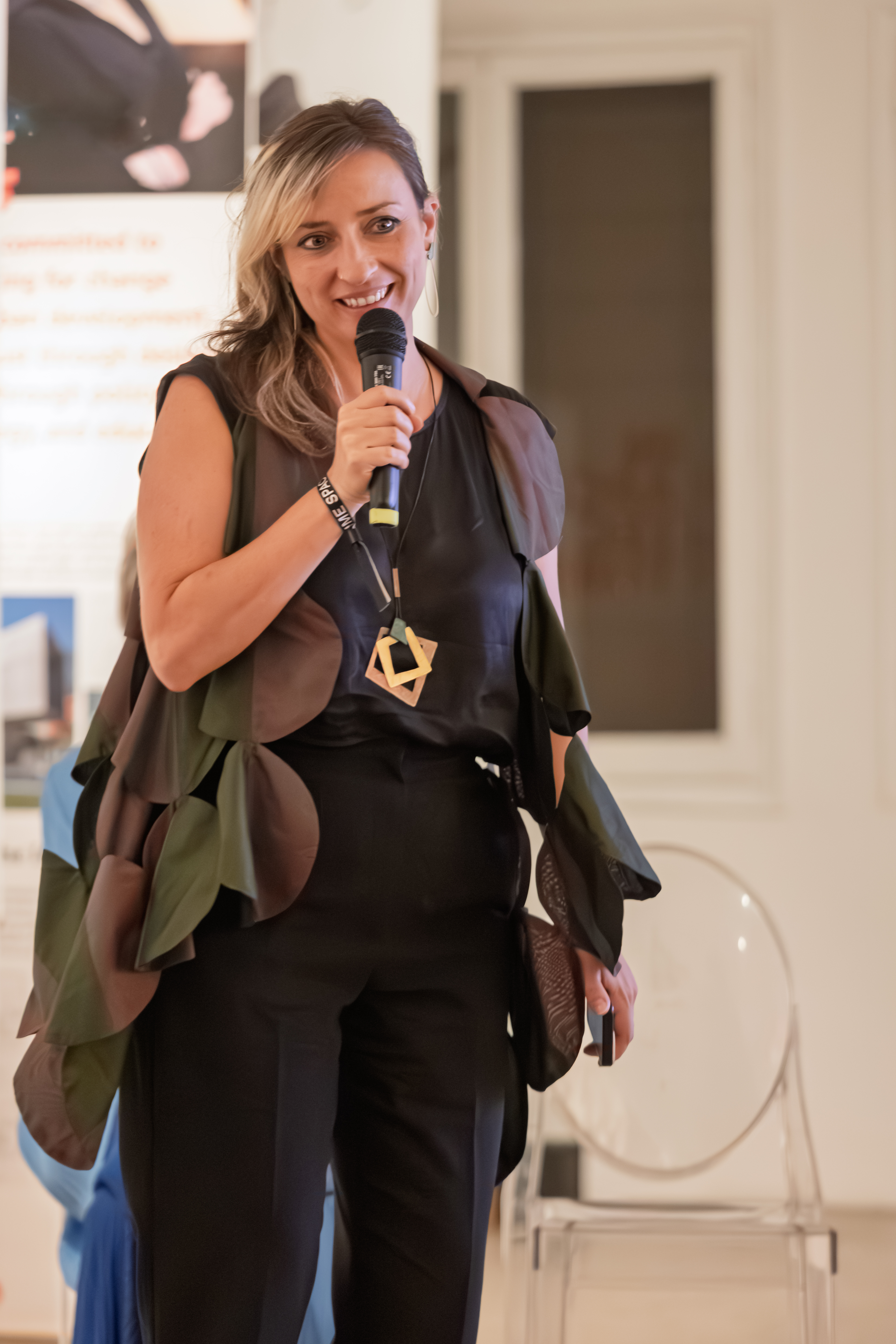
- Born: 1983 (age 42–43)
- Education: Sapienza University of Rome
- Awards: Diversity in Architecture Award (2023); Global Award for Sustainable Architecture (2018)

Marta Maccaglia (born 1983) is an Italian architect based in Peru.

== Early years ==
Maccaglia was born in Terni, Italy in 1983. She studied architecture at the Sapienza University of Rome, where she also completed a master's degree in exhibition spaces and museography.

== Career ==
In 2011, Maccaglia moved to Peru, working on architecture and cooperation projects with an Italian government programme, the Civil Service, and the NGO CPS. Three years later, she became the founder and director of non-profit architectural organization Asociación Semillas. Since then, she has taught at the University of Sciences and Arts of Latin America from 2015 to 2023 and has provided consultoring services to the Ministry of Education of Peru.

In 2018, she received the Global Award for Sustainable Architecture under the theme «Architecture as an Agent of Civic Empowerment», alongside Boonserm Premthada, Nina Maritz, Raumlabor, Anne Lacaton, Jean-Philippe Vassal, and Frédéric Druot.

In 2020, Maccaglia was a finalist for the AR Emerging Awards, hosted by The Architectural Review. Three years later, she received the inaugural Diversity in Architecture Award (DIVIA Award), a recognition "dedicated to women architects, celebrates female figures by awarding and validating their work."

In 2025, her project Territorio de los Saberes was selected as one of the awardees of that year’s Ammodo Architecture Awards.

== Style ==
Marta Maccaglia's work expands on designing schools and public spaces for indigenous communities in the Peruvian Amazonia through participatory processes in local communities and collaborating with governmental and educational institutions.

Her methodology has been defined as a "strong sense of collaborative work [as] the basis of her foundation for a harmonious social community" and as a "deep understanding of its users in their social and local context, their needs, the territory and the available resources, resulting in works that acquire a meaning beyond that of the function itself."
