= Barch =

Barch is a surname. Notable people with the surname include:

- John Barch, American poker player
- Krys Barch (born 1980), Canadian ice hockey player
- Marie Barch (1744–1827), Danish ballerina
- Otto Barch (1943–2025), Kyrgyzstani racewalker
- Joeseph Barch (1947–2021), actor, musician

== See also ==
- BArch (disambiguation)
- Bartch
