= Felecia Davis =

American architect, engineer and educator

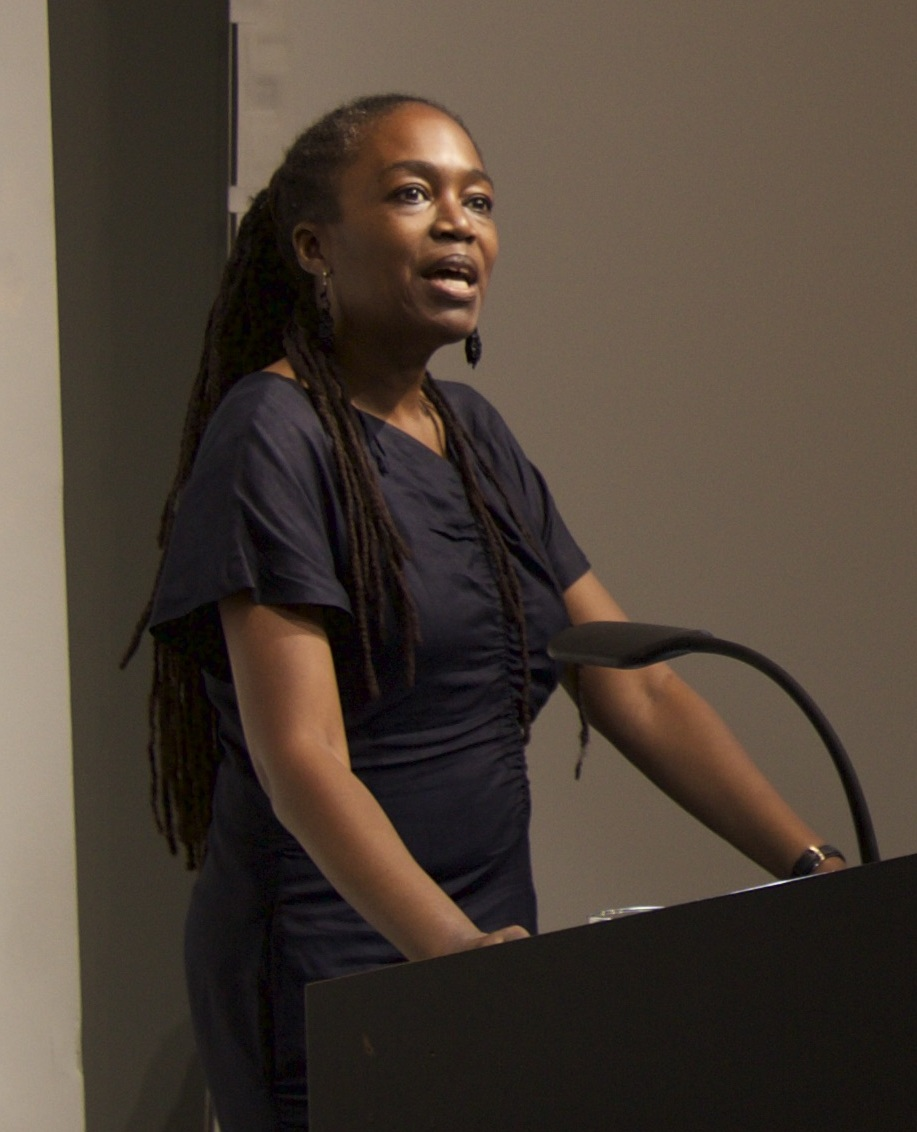
- Felecia Davis Lectures at Columbia GSAPP 2
- Education: Tufts University, Columbia University and Massachusetts Institute of Technology
- Occupation: Architect
- Design: Architextiles
- Website: feleciadavistudio.com

Felecia Davis is an American architect, engineer and educator. She is the principal of FELECIA DAVIS STUDIO where she bridges art, engineering, design and architecture. Davis is known for her work in computational textiles.

== Education ==
Davis received her Bachelor of Science of engineering from Tufts University in 1982; a Master in Architecture from Princeton University and a PhD in the Design and Computation Group in the School of Architecture and Planning at Massachusetts Institute of Technology.

== Career ==
Davis’ research explores the intersection between textiles and architecture with the aim of producing materials and objects that are responsive to their environments. More specifically, her use of Architextiles combines digital soft fabrication and computational practice to generate fabrics that can facilitate a wide range of functions. To date, Davis has developed textiles that can respond to the touch of non-verbal hospital patients; parametric tents that are able to change size and shape in response to changes in light and the number of people underneath it; as well as walls of fabric that change based on the emotions of those in the room.

In 2022, alongside Patti Anahory, she was selected as the alternate for the WOJR-Civitella Ranieri Foundation Architecture Prize.

Currently, Davis is associate professor at the Stuckeman Center for Design Computing in the School of Architecture and Landscape Architecture at Pennsylvania State University, where she is also the director of SOFTLAB@PSU. She is also a founding member of the Black Reconstruction Collective. FELECIA DAVIS STUDIO has been a finalist in many architectural design competitions.

== Bibliography ==
- SOFTBUILT : Computational Textile Architectures (2021) [S.l.]: ACTAR. ISBN 1-948765-60-8. OCLC 1226565612.
- FELT: Communication Emotion Through Textile Expression (2019), Technology|Architecture + Design, 3:2, 146–149, 2019 doi:10.1080/24751448.2019.164052
- Touch: Communication of Emotion through Computational Textile Expression (2018), Emotion and Ambient Computing Session in the HCII 2018 Proceedings, Distributed, Ambient and Pervasive Interactions, Las Vegas.
