= BArch =

BArch may refer to:

- Bundesarchiv (BArch), the German Federal Archives
- Bachelor of Architecture (B.Arch)

== See also ==
- Barch (surname)
