= Ammodo Architecture Awards =

International architecture prize

- Current: 2025 Ammodo Architecture Awards
- 2026 Ammodo Architecture Days ceremony in Amsterdam, Netherlands
- Awarded for: Advance socially and ecologically responsible architecture worldwide
- Sponsored by: Stichting Ammodo
- Country: The Netherlands
- Reward: €10,000-€150,000
- First award: 2024; 2 years ago
- Website: ammodo-architecture.org

The Ammodo Architecture Awards is an annual international prize presented to "advance socially and ecologically responsible architecture worldwide." Founded in 2024 by the Stichting Ammodo, the prize is entirely funded by the same institution.

== History ==
The Ammodo Architecture Awards was launched in 2024 by Stichting Ammodo, a Dutch foundation that supports art, science and architecture. The awards aim to "recognize and support architects and projects that address contemporary social and environmental challenges through innovative design and community engagement."

The inaugural edition received 240 applications from over 70 countries. In November 2024, the foundation announced the first 23 recipients, who hail from 18 different countries, including Japan, Spain, India, Chile, Belgium and South Africa.

== Eligibility ==
The inaugural edition was open to applicants worldwide, supported by ambassadors and a network of professionals in various regions. In addition to direct proposals, an Open Call was conducted to reach diverse networks through academia, related institutions, and professional bodies.

The awardees are recognised in three categories: Social Architecture, Social Engagement, and Local Scale. The recipients receive €150,000, €50,000, and €10,000 per project, respectively, and aim to help them support and develop their practice and new projects.

The 2024 and 2025 jury cycles comprised Joumana El Zein Khoury, Andrés Jaque, Anupama Kundoo, Floris Alkemade and Mariam Issoufou; with the addition of Loreta Castro Reguera in 2025.
