= Maison folie de Wazemmes =

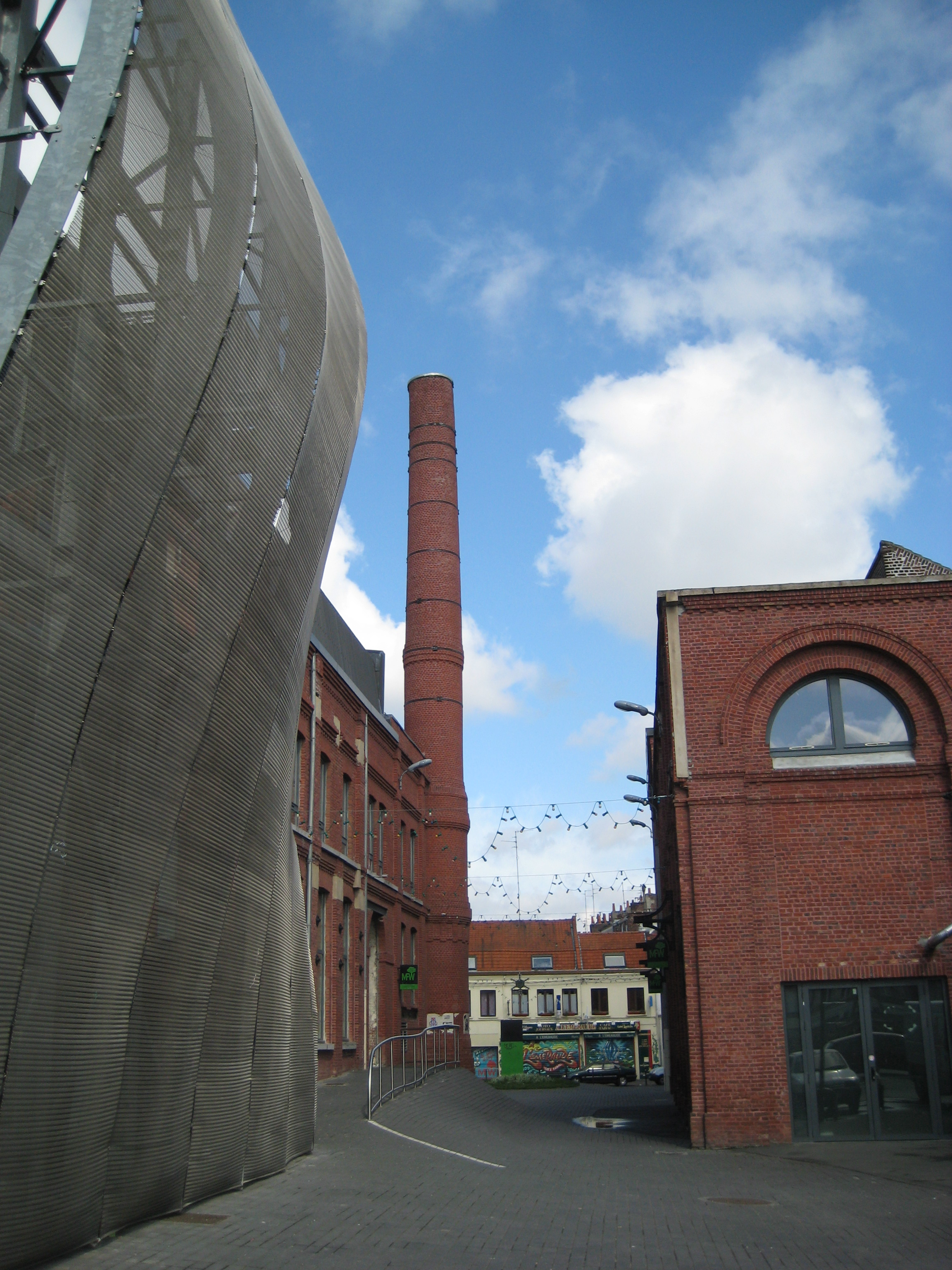
- Maison folie de Wazemmes
- Interactive map of Maison folie de Wazemmes
- Former names: Maison folie de Wazemmes
- Address: 70 Rue des Sarrazins
- Location: Lille, France
- Coordinates: 50.624636°N 3.048253°E
- Owner: City of Lille

Construction
- Opened: 2004

Website
- Venue Website (in French)

The Maison Folie Wazemmes is a cultural facility of the City of Lille, opened on the occasion of the Lille 2004 event, the European Capital of Culture. This former textile mill was rehabilitated by the Dutch agency Nox and the architect Lars Spuybroek accompanied by Ducks Scéno (Stylized as dUCKS scéno) a French company based in Villeurbanne specializing in scenography and museography. for the design of the scenography of the 250-seat auditorium and the recording studio and Flanders Analyzes for the acoustic studies, to become in 2004, the house Folie Wazemmes.

== Description ==
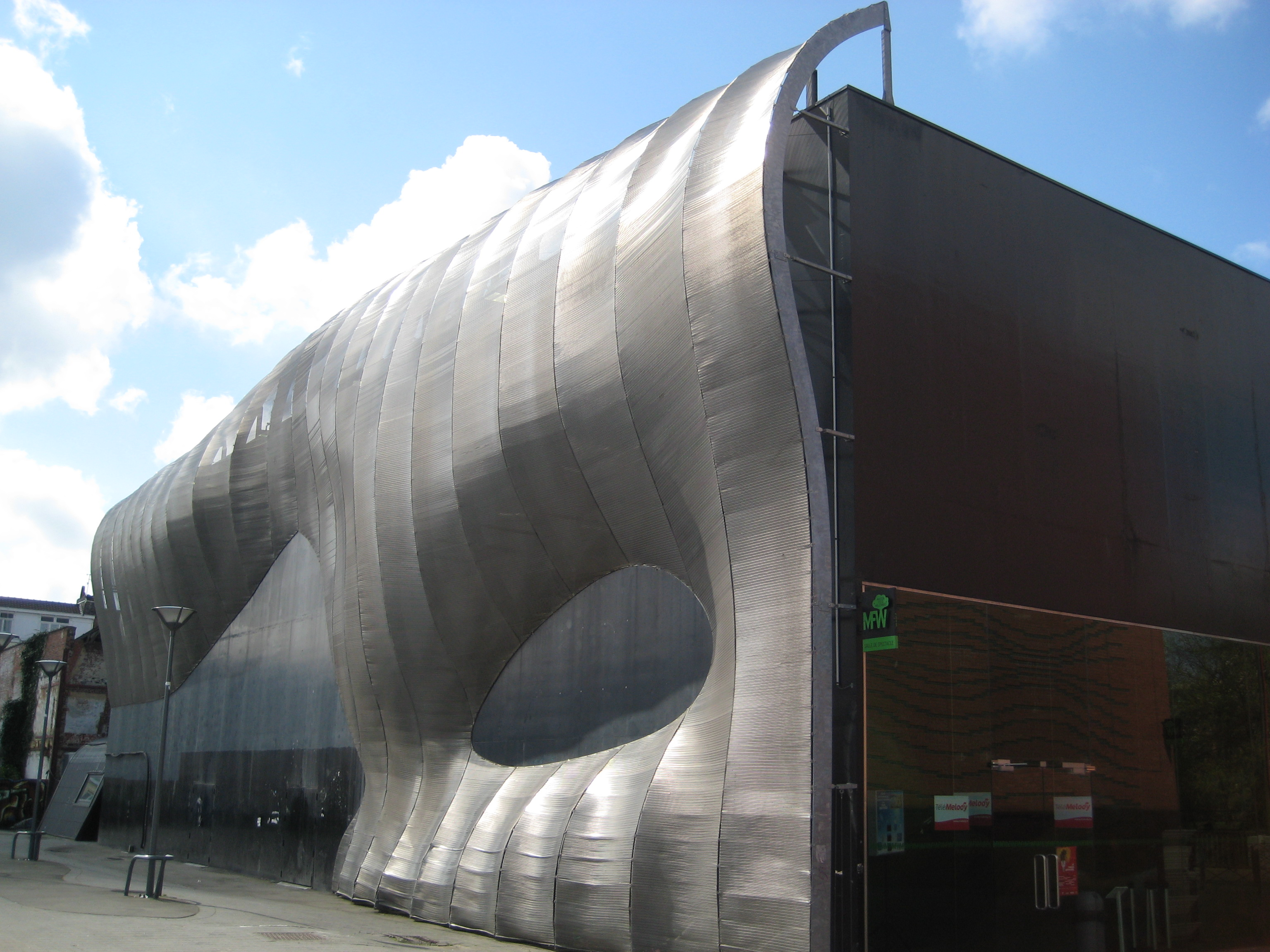
Wazemmes Maison folie

The old factory, consisting of two buildings arranged opposite each other and separated by an interior street, now contains exhibition rooms, creative and residential spaces, an inn, a meeting room, conviviality areas and work rooms. A new building with metallic cladding serves as a performance hall. Visitors can move from one space to another along the second interior street, an important thoroughfare in the district. The complex is located at 70 rue des Sarrazins in the Wazemmes district.

== Bibliography ==
- Laissez vous conter la maison folie Wazemmes, Service ville d'art et d'histoire, 2011

== See also ==
- Official site.
