= Hylozoic Ground =

Interactive model of architecture

Hylozoic Ground is an interactive model of architecture which was presented in the Venice Biennale of 2010 and the 18th Biennale of Sydney in 2012. Hylozoic Ground is an exemplar of live architecture: it is an installation by Philip Beesley, who is a professor at the University of Waterloo.

== Hylozoism ==
Hylozoism is the word from which "Hylozoic" is derived. The philosophical viewpoint of hylozoism holds that matter is alive in some way.

== Features ==
It is a kind of architextiles. Hylozoic is a textile matrix that supports responsive activities, ''dynamic material exchanges, and living technologies in an immersive, interactive sculpture environment.''

Hylozoic Ground is a work of experimental architecture that explores the aspects of contemporary wilderness. The Canada Pavilion was transformed into an artificial forest through the use of an intricate lattice of tiny transparent acrylic meshwork links, which were covered in a network of interactive mechanical fronds, filters, and filaments.
