= Patti Anahory =

Cape Verde architect (born 1969)

- Born: 1969; São Tomé
- Education: Princeton University, Boston Architectural College
- Awards: Rotch Travelling Scholarship (2000)

Patricia Anahory (born 1969) is a Cape Verdean architect. In 2000, she became the first Black person and only the second woman to receive the Rotch Traveling Scholarship.

== Biography ==
Born on a ship traveling on the Atlantic Ocean en route to São Tomé and Principe, Anahory lived there for seven years before being raised in Cape Verde. She moved to the United States where she studied architecture at the Boston Architectural College and earned a Master of Architecture degree from Princeton University.

In 2000, she became the first Black person and only the second woman to receive the Rotch Traveling Scholarship. Her research funded by the scholarship involved traveling across the African continent to study the relationship between architecture and identity.

From 2009 to 2012, Anahory served as the founding director of CIDLOT, a multidisciplinary research center at the University of Cape Verde, where she introduced "decolonial approaches to broader research."

In 2022, alongside Felecia Davis, she was selected as the alternate for the WOJR-Civitella Ranieri Foundation Architecture Prize. Since that same year, Anahory has served on the Board of Academic Advisors at the African Futures Institute (AFI), an independent postgraduate center for architectural research in Ghana, led by Royal Gold Medal winner Lesley Lokko. From 2022 to 2023, Anahory was a visiting professor at Columbia University.

She has been a member of the jury for various academic, national and international awards, including the first edition of the Africa Architecture Awards in 2017 and the 2023 RIBA President's Dissertation Medal, alongside Samir Pandya, Belgin Turan Ozkaya, Luca Molinari, Richard Anderson and Katy Beinart.

She is the co-founder of Storia na Lugar, a storytelling and counter-narrative platform whose work was exhibited at the 17th International Architecture Exhibition at the 2021 Venice Biennale of Architecture. She also co-curates her(e), otherwise, an experimental platform that invites African and diaspora women architects to interrogate notions of representation and belonging.

Her research focuses on "interrogating narratives of belonging across geopolitical, memory, race, gender constructs, and on exploring the politics of identity from an African island perspective."

She has various completed architecture projects in Cabo Verde, Ghana, and Portugal.

== Publications ==
- 2022: Panorama of Dwelling Architecture in Cabo Verde (Panorama da Arquitetura Habitacional em Cabo Verde), Edições UniCV, alongside Andreia Moassab.
