= Caroline Pidcock =

Australian architect

Caroline Pidcock is an Australian architect and an advocate for sustainable development, based in Sydney, New South Wales.

== Early life and education ==
Caroline Pidcock graduated from the University of Sydney in 1987 with a Bachelor of Architecture (Hons). She worked for Alex Popov while she was studying.

== Career ==
Following her graduation, Pidcock worked in London with the architectural practice Jestico + Whiles, before returning to Australia to work briefly in the office of Conybeare Morrison. She then worked for two years with Grose Bradley before establishing Pidcock Architecture and Sustainability in 1992.

== Other activities ==
Pidcock is a campaigner for environmental and community issues. Her commitment led to her standing as an independent candidate for the Legislative Council in the 2007 New South Wales state election and appointment as an ambassador for the Al Gore Climate Change and 1 Million Women initiatives – a movement of women and girls fighting climate change by taking practical action.

Pidcock has been an active voice in the Millers Point Residents Action Group, campaigning to retain public housing in Millers Point and Dawes Point. She is also currently a member of the Sacred Heart Education Ministry and the South Australian Forestry Industry Advisory Boards. Previously she has also held presidential roles with the New South Wales and National Councils of the Royal Australian Institute of Architects, and the Australian Sustainable Built Environment Council; Chaired the Carriageworks and Living Future Institute of Australia Boards; has been a member of the New South Wales Architects Registration and Bicycle New South Wales Boards; representative for the industry on the Australian Building Codes Board and held adjunct roles at several New South Wales based universities.

As part of the centenary of Canberra celebrations, Pidcock delivered the "Magic of Australia – with regards to the Griffins" lecture for the Walter Burley Griffin Society's annual Marion Mahony Griffin Lecture.

Pidcock served as New South Wales Chapter president and national director of the Australian Institute of Architects for a period of three years, during which time she developed an effective profile with media and government to promote a wider interest in architecture, design and urban affairs.

== Recognition and awards ==
Pidcock's sustained leadership in built environment sector led to her appointment as a Life Fellow of the Royal Australian Institute of Architects in 2006.

In November 2009, Pidcock was awarded a Byera Hadley Travelling Scholarship to investigate "The Architecture of Zero Emissions Housing", to investigate how this might impact the technical and design approaches of the practice. Extending the ideas of this research led her to the Living Building Challenge, where she joined the board, and in 2013 established and chaired the Living Futures Institute Australia. As a result of her contribution, Pidcock was recognised as a "Living Building Hero" by the International Living Future Institute in 2014.

In July 2011, Pidcock was awarded the Marion Mahony Griffin Award by the Australian Institute of Architects in recognition of her contribution to architecture in New South Wales.

In 2013, Smart Company named Pidcock one of five women set to disrupt the industries for her work to produce kit homes, following the receipt of a Commercialisation Australia grant, in November 2013, to assist in the commercialisation of a new system in conjunction with Origination | &U.

Professional and academic associations
Preceded by Graham Jahn	President of the Royal Australian Institute of Architects (NSW Chapter); 2002–2004	Succeeded by Deborah Dearing
