= Anupama Kundoo =

Indian architect

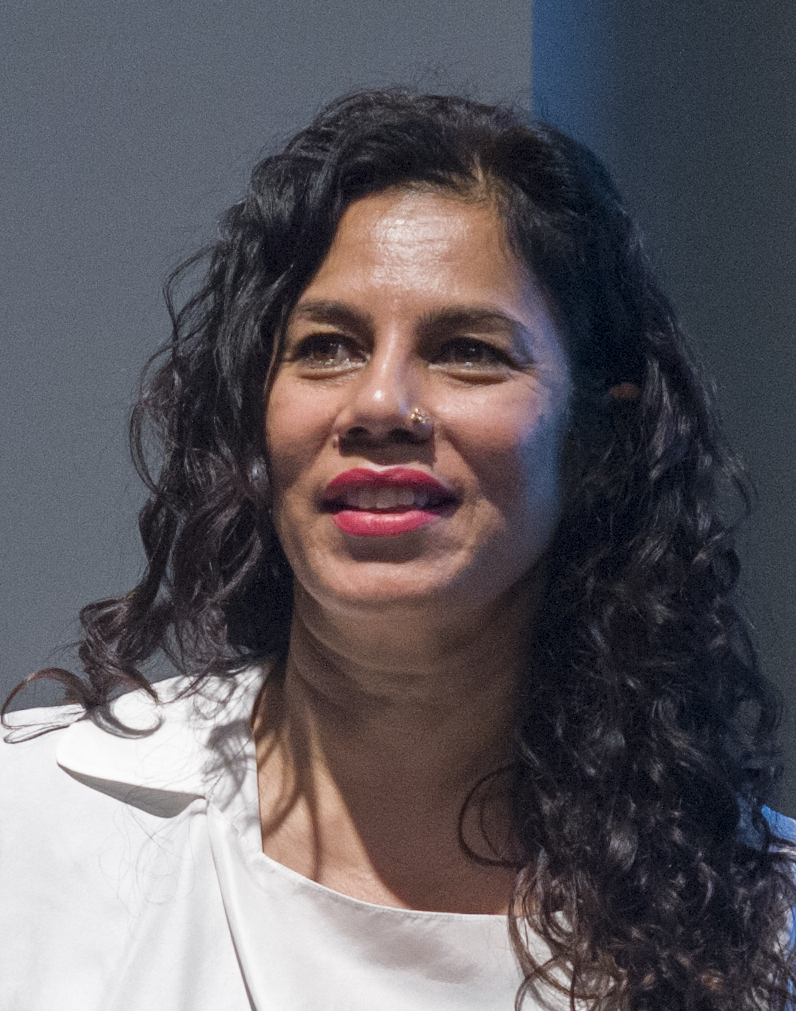
- Anupama Kundoo
- Born: April 24, 1967 (age 59)
- Occupations: Architect, Professor
- Years active: 1990–present
- Family: House of Dar

Anupama Kundoo is an Indian architect academic, and researcher. Her practice and research focus on material experimentation, sustainable architecture, and low-cost, energy-efficient building technologies.

== Early life and education ==
Kundoo was born on 24 April 1967 in Pune to Bengali parents who relocated from Dhaka to Bombay. Kundoo is a descendant of Hatkhola and Manikganj royal family via Peary Charan Sarkar and Maharaja Manik Ram Basu and also Dar Raj Kashmiri Zamindari via Judge and former Dewan of Mayurbhanj Mohini Mohan Dhar Esq. and Maharaja Virendra Mohan Dar.

Anupama Kundoo studied architecture at the Sir J. J. College of Architecture, University of Bombay and received her degree in 1989. She was awarded the Vastu Shilpa Foundation Fellowship in 1996 for her thesis on "Urban Eco-Community: Design and Analysis for Sustainability". She was awarded her doctoral degree from Technische Universität Berlin in 2008.

Kundoo established herself as an architect in Auroville in 1990 where she designed and built many buildings with "energy and water efficient infrastructure" adaptations. She worked here from middle of 1990 till 2002.

Kundoo taught at Technische Universität Berlin and later at Technische Universität Darmstadt during 2005. She worked as Assistant Professor at Parsons The New School for Design, New York until 2011 then moving to Australia as a senior lecturer in the University of Queensland. In 2014, she returned to Europe and began working at the European School of Architecture and Technology at the Universidad Camilo José Cela in Madrid. Since 2024 she has been a Full Professor for Architecture and Design Methods at TU Berlin.

== Work ==
Her approach to building design is based on material research that minimizes environmental effects. Her basic design approach is to use "waste materials, unskilled labour and local communities".

One of the notable buildings built for her own residence is titled the "Wall House", built in a community area of 15 acres (6.1 ha) with a built-in space of 100 square metres (1,100 sq ft) constructed for one million Rupees in 2000, in Auroville for communal living. This house is L-Shaped in the plan, has a courtyard in the middle; while it is modern in concept it adopts traditional "vernacular" use of materials such as compressed earth, concrete, and steel. The bathroom is set in an open-to-sky design, with smooth merging with the interior and external spaces and landscaped, giving it both a modern and a regional appearance. A full-sized replica of her Wall House was made by hand and exhibited at the Venice Biennale of Architecture. New York Times called it as "a gem among rubble".

Another of her theme is "Liberty" which presents a reading place as a free library, a creation built with three types of trees fixed in the centre of a square space. The trees' trunks and branches are made from steel and the leaves made of salvaged books, with the floor made of concrete. This was exhibited at the Placa de Salvador Segui in Barcelona during June–September 2014.

In 2024, Kundoo joined the judging panel for the Dezeen Awards alongside other prominent architects. In the same year, she was part of the multidisciplinary advisory committee for the inaugural Ammodo Architecture Awards.

== Select architectural projects ==
- Wall House, Auroville, India, 1997–2000.
- Town Hall, Auroville, India, 2006–.
- Nandalal Sewa Samithi Library, Pondicherry, India, 2018.
- Sharana Daycare Center, Pondicherry, India, 2019.

== Publications ==
Books

- Roger Anger: Research on Beauty/Recherche sur la beauté Architecture 1958–2008, jovis Verlag GmbH, Berlin, 2009
- AVPNY Auroville and Pondicherry Architectural Travel Guide, Altrim Publishers, Barcelona, November 2019
- Anupama Kundoo.The Architect's Studio, Lars Müller Publishers, 2020
- Abundance not capital, Architekturzentrum Wien / MIT Press, 2025

Papers

- Das Tauziehen zwischen Umweltschutz und Entwicklung, Bauwelt, Bauverlag BV GmbH, Gütersloh, March 2011
- More than cladding, Design Today, Living Media India Ltd, New Delhi, June 2010
- Who decides what’s green, Design Today, Living Media India Ltd, New Delhi, March 2010
- Urban development, Options for urbanisation, Survey of the environment, The Hindu, Chennai, 2008
- Roger Anger: Chief Architect of Auroville, Architecture Time Space & People, Magazine of the Council of Architecture, India, Delhi, May 2008
- Auroville: An Architectural Laboratory, Made in India, AD Architectural Design, John Wiley and Sons Ltd., London, November – December 2007
- Eco-friendly Approach, Architecture + Design, Vol. XXIII, No 2, Media Transasia, Delhi, February 2006
- Sustainability and Globalisation, Indian Architect & Builder, Jasubhai Publications, Mumbai, July 2005
- Devoted to Dance, Ray Meeker´s expression to Protima Bedi´s parting gift, a fired temple at Nrityagram, Inside Outside, Mumbai, October 2000
- Cues from the Past – Local details and traditional elements in a contemporary structure, Indian Architect & Builder, Jasubhai Publications, Mumbai, October 1997
- Comments on Building Blocks, Indian Architect & Builder, Jasubhai Publications, Mumbai, January 1992

== Exhibitions ==
- Abundance not capital, Architekturzentrum Wien, Vienna, Austria, 18 September 2025 – 9 March 2026
- The Architect’s Studio, Anupama Kundoo – Taking Time, Louisiana Museum of Modern Art, Denmark, 8 October 2020 – 16 May 2021
- High‐speed housing, Roca London Gallery, London, United Kingdom 31 March-18 June 2016
- Wall House One to One, La Biennale di Venezia, Venice, 2012

== Awards ==
- 2021: The RIBA Charles Jencks Award, awarded jointly by the Jencks Foundation and the Royal Institute of British Architects.
- 2021: The Auguste Perret prize

== Bibliography ==
- Anger, Roger (2009). Roger Anger: Recherche Sur la Beauté : Architecture 1953–2008. Jovis. ISBN 978-3-86859-006-7.
- Architects, Royal Institute of British (2001). World Architecture. Grosvenor Press International, Limited.
- Desāi, Mādhavī; Desai, Madhavi; Desai, Miki; Lang, Jon (2012). The Bungalow in Twentieth-Century India: The Cultural Expression of Changing Ways of Life and Aspirations in the Domestic Architecture of Colonial and Post-colonial Society. Ashgate Publishing, Ltd. ISBN 978-1-4094-2738-4.
- Haddad, Dr Elie G; Rifkind, Asst Prof David; Deyong, Ms Sarah (28 March 2014). A Critical History of Contemporary Architecture: 1960–2010. Ashgate Publishing, Ltd. ISBN 978-1-4724-2937-7.
- Tipnis, Aishwarya (1 January 2012). Vernacular Traditions: contemporary architecture. The Energy and Resources Institute (TERI). ISBN 978-81-7993-457-9.
- An emancipated place : the proceedings of the conference and exhibition held in Mumbai, February 2000 : women in architecture, 2000 plus : a conference on the work of women architects : focus South Asia. Somaya, Brinda., Mehta, Urvashi., Hecar Foundation. Mumbai: Hecar Foundation. 2000. ISBN 8175251948. OCLC 48041242.
