= 17th Venice Architecture Biennale =

2021 international architecture exhibition in Venice, Italy

- Genre: Architecture exhibition
- Begins: May 22, 2021
- Ends: November 21, 2021
- Location: Venice
- Country: Italy
- Previous event: 16th Venice Architecture Biennale (2018)

The 17th International Architecture Exhibition of the Venice Architecture Biennale was an upcoming international architecture exhibition. The Biennale takes place biennially in Venice, Italy. Due to the COVID-19 pandemic, the exhibition took place in 2021 instead of 2020.

== Background ==
The 17th Exhibition will run between May 22 and November 21, 2021, with two pre-opening days. In light of several festival postponements in northern Italy due to the COVID-19 pandemic, there had been speculation about delaying the exhibition, and while it was originally announced as opening in May, amid increased international precautions over the following weeks, the exhibition's opening was initially postponed to August, halving the exhibition's run, before being rescheduled to the following year

== Central exhibition ==
Curated by Hashim Sarkis, the exhibition's theme is "How will we live together?" From 46 participating countries, 114 participants will present work at the Giardini's Central Pavilion, the Arsenale, Forte Marghera, and the external spaces around those areas. National participants were asked to focus on "the need for more inclusive social housing and urban connectivity."

== National pavilions ==
The exhibition will include 63 national pavilions in the Giardini and across the city.

The 17th exhibition marked the first participation from Grenada, Iraq, and Uzbekistan.

=== Iraq ===
The first-ever participation by Iraq was an exhibition called Ark re-imagined: The expeditionary pavilion by Rashad Salim, curated by Safina Projects, produced by Community Jameel and Culturunners, and commissioned by the Ministry of Culture, Tourism and Antiquities. The pavilion was hosted by TBA21–Academy at the Ocean Space in the church of San Lorenzo.

The pavilion examined the role of traditional Marsh Arab watercraft from the Mesopotamian Marshes in southern Iraq, their relationship to gondolas and the Venetian lagoon, and human responses to climate change. The pavilion was selected by The Art Newspaper, Architectural Digest and ArchDaily in their reviews of pavilions to-see, and received extensiove coverage in Arab media, including Arab News, The National and Gulf Today.

== Awards ==
The exhibition's awards will be presented at its inauguration.
