= Geeta Mehta =

Indian-American social entrepreneur, urban designer, architect, and author

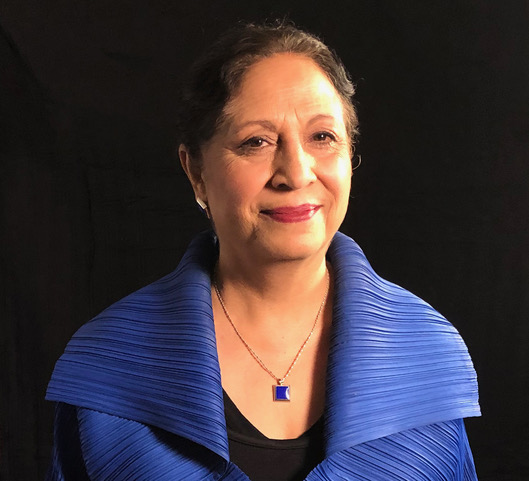
- Education: School of Planning and Architecture, New Delhi; Columbia Graduate School of Architecture, Planning and Preservation, New York
- Occupations: Architect, urban planner and activist

Geeta Mehta is an Indian-American social entrepreneur, urban designer, architect and author. She is the co-founder of Asia Initiatives, and URBZ, and an adjunct professor at the Graduate School of Architecture Planning and Preservation at Columbia University.

== Early life and education ==
Mehta was born in Simla, India. She earned her bachelor's degree in architecture from the School of Planning and Architecture, New Delhi, a master's degree in architecture and urban design from Columbia University, and a doctorate in urban engineering from the University of Tokyo.

== Career ==
Mehta is an adjunct professor of architecture and urban design at the Graduate School of Architecture Planning and Preservation at Columbia University in New York City. She is also a research affiliate at the Center for Sustainable Urban Development at Columbia Climate School. Until 2009, Mehta was a professor of architecture at Temple University campus in Tokyo.

She founded with business partner Jill Braden the interior design firm Braden & Mehta Design in Honolulu and New York City. The blend of Western and Asian influences appear in the firm's work throughout U.S., Vietnam, and India as well for various corporations and private homes.

Mehta appeared in Citizen Jane: Battle for the City, a documentary film about activist Jane Jacobs directed by Matt Tyrnauer. Mehta, in the film, warned that global development, without the philosophies of Jacobs, could result in "the slums of the future".

She was appointed in 2018 by New York City Mayor Bill de Blasio to the Waterfront Management advisory board.

She has spoken on social capital, sustainable and equitable urbanism, and community-based change at forums in Australia, Austria, Brazil, India, Japan, UAE and the US, including the Public Ideas Form in Perth, Australia, and the Post City event at ARS Electronica in Linz, Austria. She also was a panelist at WomenDeliver in Copenhagen, Denmark and the Women's Summit in Sharjah organized by UN Women.

She is on the board of WomenStrong International, The Center for the Living City, and Friends of University of Tokyo. She previously was on the advisory board of the Millennium Cities Initiative of the Earth Institute at Columbia University, and People Building Better Cities.

=== Asia Initiatives ===
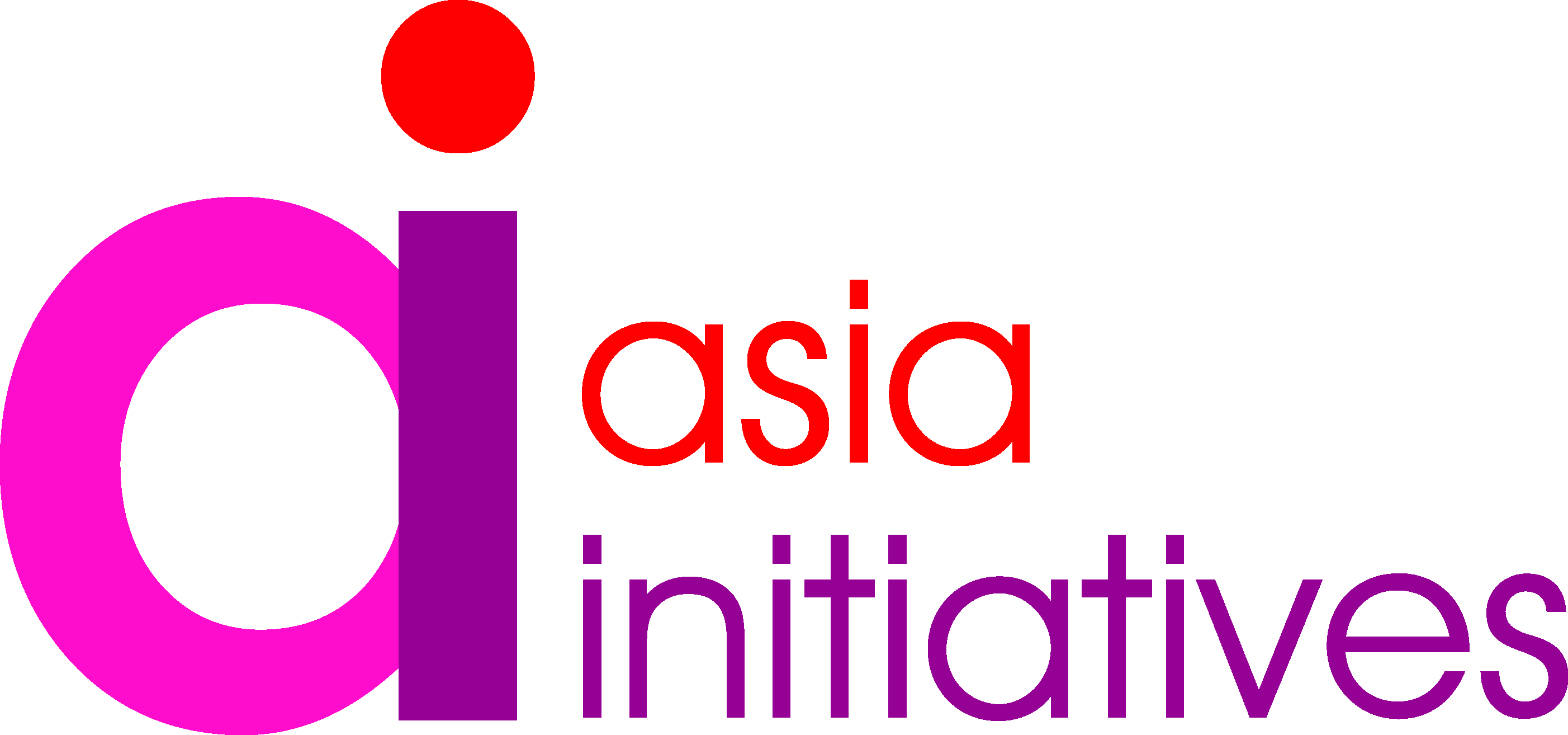
Asia Initiatives: Empowering Women by Social Capital

Inspired by M. S. Swaminathan, a scientist and humanist, Geeta and Krishen Mehta co-founded Asia Initiatives in 1999 in Tokyo. Since 2010 it has been registered as a 501(c)(3) non-profit organization in New York City. As advised by Prof. Swaminathan, all Asia Initiatives projects are pro-poor, pro-environment and pro-women. These include projects in education, up-skilling, nature based agriculture, climate resilience, healthcare and micro credit in underserved areas with NGO and/or government partners in India, Kenya, Taiwan and the United States.

The M.S. Swaminathan Award, instituted in 2014, was presented at the Asia Initiatives Annual Galas to the economist Jeffrey Sachs (2014), Indra Nooyi for steering PepsiCo towards Performance with Purpose (2015),Kerry Kennedy for her work on human rights (2016), and Dr. Mattoo for his commitment to educational causes (2016).

The 8th Secretary General of the United Nations, Ban Ki-moon, is a patron of Asia Initiatives. In his honor, Asia initiatives instituted the Ban Ki-moon Award for Women's Empowerment in 2017. The recipients of the award have included Jane Goodall, Paul Polman, Gloria Steinem, Yue Sai Kan, Pat Mitchell, Ricky Kej, Eva Haller, Chelsea Clinton, Kiran Mazumdar Shaw, Mitzi Perdue, Dr. Susan Blaustein, Kathy Matsui, Cecile Richards, Madhura Swaminathan and Lee Bae-yong.

=== SoCCs (Social Capital Credits) ===
Mehta is the innovator of Social Capital Credits (SoCCs), a community currency for social good to help communities climb out of poverty. People earn SoCCs by helping their communities according to the SoCCs menus created by them during SoCCratic dialogues, and redeem them for education, healthcare, up-skilling and micro-credit.

The SoCCs team at Asia Initiatives works with communities to customize SoCCs menus to their specific needs and capabilities during the SoCCratic dialogues. SoCCs Earning Menus include items such as sending children (especially daughters) to high school, waste management, providing childcare or senior care, switching to regenerative agriculture, helping make rainwater harvesting structures, planting trees, and paving streets. iSoCCs Redemption Menus include items such as school fees, skill training classes, home repairs and telephone talk time. CommSoCCs can then be used for common projects such as a micro-sewage system, improvements to streets or public spaces, or child-care centers. A local SoCC Manager is trained to work with the community. Mehta has appeared in articles in Forbes and Huffington Post which describe the creation and use of SoCCs in greater detail. Asia Initiatives was among the six winners of the Amravati Happy Cities competition in April 2018, and had signed an MoU with the government of Andhra Pradesh to implement SoCCs in this new city.

In 2019, SoCCs received Fast Company's 2020 World Changing Ideas Awards, MIT Inclusive Innovation Award in 2019 for the Asia Region category. In 2020, Asia Initiatives received awards from MIT SOLVE, General Motors, Vodafone and Experian. In 2021, Asia Initiative received the Jacobs Foundation Conference Grand Innovation prize.

=== URBZ ===
With urban planner Matias Echanove and urban anthropologist Rahul Srivastava, Mehta co-founded URBZ: User Generated Cities, a research collective that focuses on participatory urban planning and design systems. URBZ was named one of the 100 most influential names in architecture in the world by the magazine Il Giornale dell'Architettura.

== Bibliography ==
- City Connect: Regeneration, Sustainability and Equity in the 21st Century, released in 2016 by Arch-media Inc. and co-edited with George Kunihiro
- New Japan Architecture, published in 2011 by Tuttle Publishing and co-authored with Deanna MacDonald
- Japan Gardens: Tranquility, Simplicity, Harmony, released in 2008 by Tuttle Publishing and co-authored with Kimie Tada
- Japan Living: Form & Function at the Cutting Edge, released in 2008 by Tuttle Publishing and co-authored with Marcia Iwatate
- Japan Houses: Ideas for 21st Century Living, published in 2005 by Tuttle Publishing and co-authored with Iwatate; and
- Japan Style: Architecture + Interiors + Design, released in 2004 by Tuttle Publishing and co-authored with Tada.

== Awards ==
Mehta was named in 2015 by Women's eNews as one of the 21 leaders of the 21st century. In addition Mehta was honored by The Office of the Principal Scientific Advisor, Government of India’s one of the 75 women in STEAM to commemorate India’s 75th year of Independence.

== Personal life ==
Mehta is married to Krishen Mehta of New York, who retired as a partner from PricewaterhouseCoopers to advise Global Financial Integrity, and the couple has two sons, Ravi Mehta and Arjun Mehta.
