= Andrés Jaque =

Spanish architect, writer and curator

- Born: Madrid, Spain
- Education: Escuela Técnica Superior de Arquitectura de Madrid (M.Arch., 1997), (Ph.D., 2016)
- Occupation: Architect
- Awards: 2025 American Academy of Arts and Letters, Architecture Award; 2024 UNESCO Global Award for Sustainable Architecture; 2023 FAD Architecture Award; 2022 ICON Design Architecture Award; 2016 Frederick Kiesler Architecture and Art Prize; 2014 Silver Lion to the Best Research Project of the 14 Mostra Internazionale di Architettura; Biennale di Venezia, 2021 FAD Award; 2007 Dionisio Hernández Gil Award; 2015 MoMA PS1 Young Architects Program Award
- Practice: Office for Political Innovation, OFFPOLINN
- Projects: Reggio School in El Encinar de los Reyes; TBA21 Ocean Space in Venice; Babin Yar Museum of Memory and Oblivion in Kyiv; Casa Sacerdotal Diocesana in Plasencia; Rambla Climate-House in Molina de Segura; House in Never Never Land in Ibiza; RunRunRun in Madrid; Escaravox in Matadero-Madrid; COSMO MoMA PS1

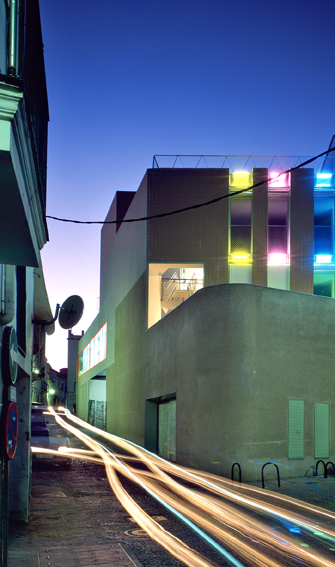
Priests House in Plasencia. 2004

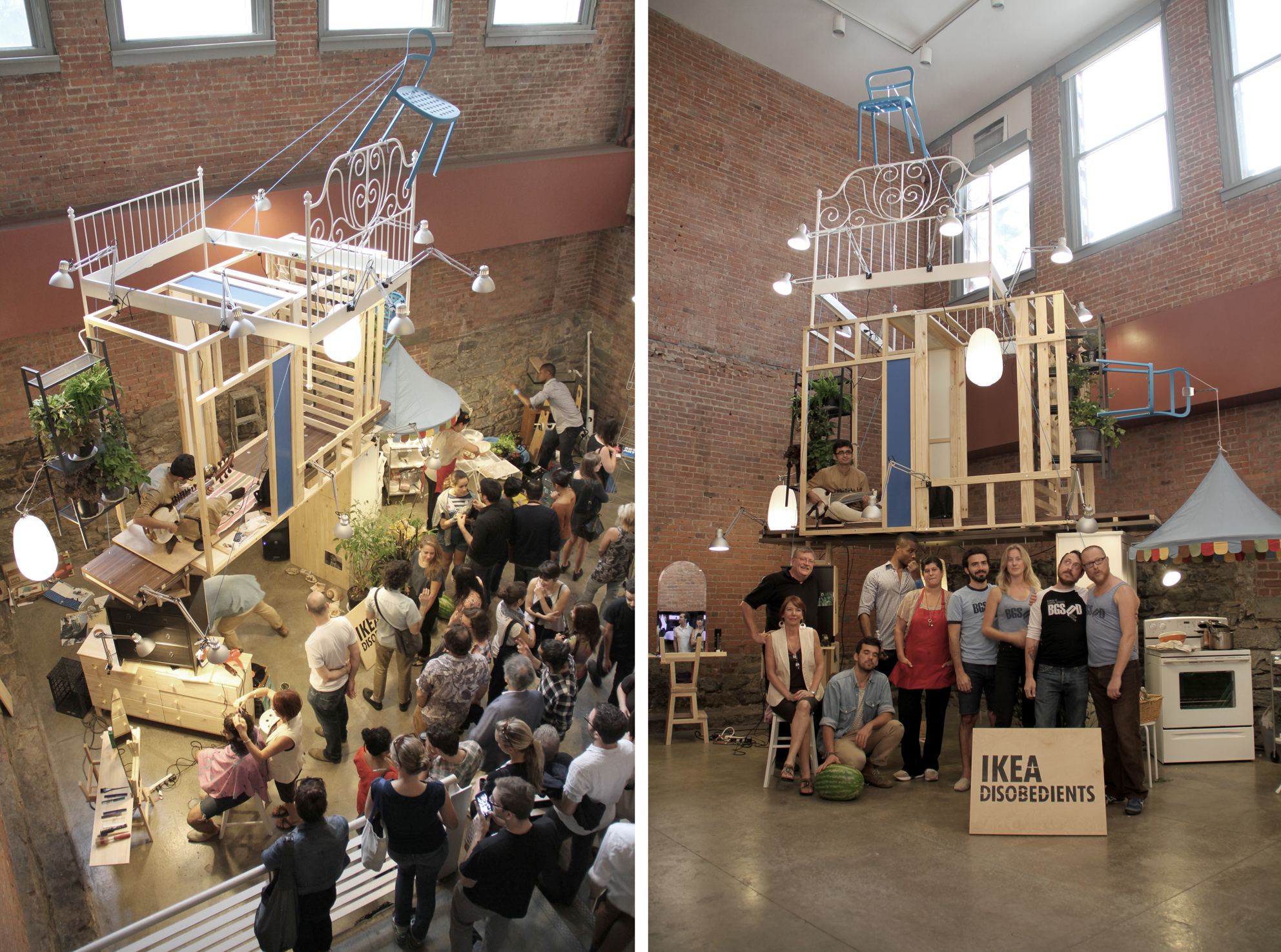
'IKEA Disobedients'. Architectural archive, installation and performance on non familiar domestic urbanisms. MoMA Collection. 2012.

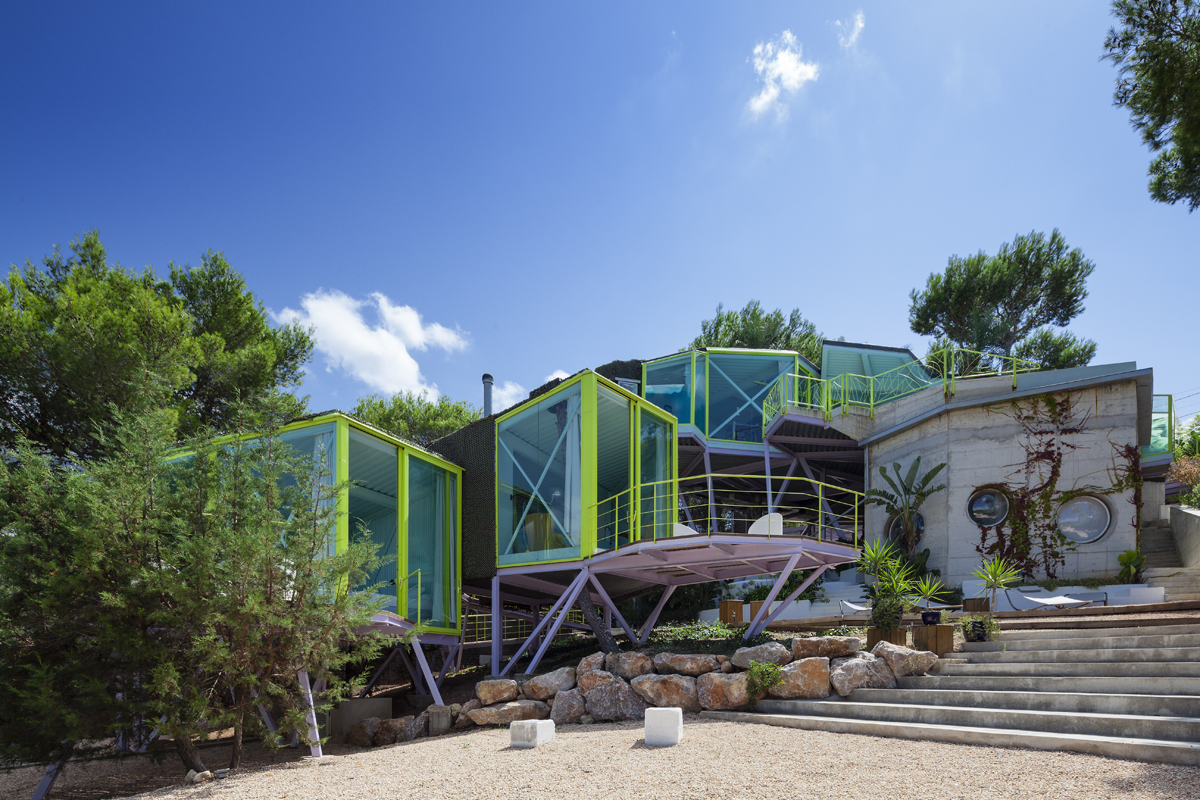
House in Never Never Land. Cala Vadella, San José (Ibiza).

Andrés Jaque is a Spanish architect, scholar, writer and curator. In 2016, he was awarded with the 10th Frederick Kiesler Prize for Architecture and the Arts., in 2024 he won the UNESCO Global Award for Sustainable Architecture, and in 2014, the Silver Lion to the Best Project at the 14th Venice Biennale. His work explores architecture as a cosmopolitical practice. In 2003, he founded the Office for Political Innovation, a transdisciplinary agency working in the intersection of design, research and environmental activism.

Andrés Jaque is the Dean of Columbia Graduate School of Architecture, Planning and Preservation.

== Life and career ==
Jaque is the author of award-winning architectural projects, including the Reggio School (El Encinar de los Reyes, 2020), the Babin Yar Museum of Memory and Oblivion in Kyiv, the Ocean Space for Thyssen-Bornemisza Contemporary Art (Venice, 2018), Casa Sacerdotal Diocesana de Plasencia; 2004. Teddy House (Vigo, 2003, 2005), Mousse City, (Stavanger, 2003); Peace Foam City (Ceuta, 2005); Skin Gardens (Barcelona 2006); the Museo Postal de Bogotá (Bogotá, 2007), Rolling House for the Rolling Society (Barcelona, 2009); the House in Never Never Land (Ibiza, 2009); the ESCARAVOX, (Madrid, 2012), Hänsel and Gretel's Arenas (Madrid, 2013), Shading Devices and Gathering Space for Masdar (Abu Dabhi, 2015); Weizmann Square (Holon, 2014), COSMO PS1 (New York,2015), Rómola (Madrid, 2018) and RunRunRun (Madrid, 2019).

He has also developed a number of architectural experiments meant to interrogate architecture's political agency. The 12 Actions to Make Peter Eisenman Transparent, 2010, a project devoted to make public the political implications of the construction of the singular building site Cidade da Cultura in Santiago de Compostela. A series of actions described by Bruno Latour as a «beautiful mixture of art, politics and building-site».

His 2012 intervention in the Barcelona Pavilion, ‘PHANTOM. Mies as Rendered Society’ made visible all the processes involved in the daily fabrication of the pavilion as an ordinary reality. Buckets, flags, chairs, old faded curtains, the salt that keeps the ponds pristine or the result of failed experiments carried out at the pavilion, were kept at the so far unnoticed basement. This work is part of the collection of the Art Institute of Chicago, and it is at shown as part of its permanent exhibition.

His work 'IKEA Disobedients' (Madrid, New York 2012) was the first architectural performance to be included in the MoMA's collection. He has also participated in the performance art biennial Performa 21 with his work Being Silica (2021).

Andrés Jaque holds a PhD degree in architecture, has been Tessenow Stipendiat, Graham Foundation Grantee, and is Professor of Architecture and the Dean of Columbia University GSAPP and previously he has been Visiting Professor at Princeton University School of Architecture and the Cooper Union.

He is the Chief Curator of the 13th Shanghai Art Biennale, titled ‘Bodies of Water’, and co-curator of Manifesta 12 in Palermo, ‘The Planetary Garden. Cultivating Coexistence’.

In 2024, Jaque was part of the multidisciplinary advisory committee for the inaugural Ammodo Architecture Awards.

== Books ==
Andrés Jaque and the Office for Political Innovation have made major contributions to conceptualize the implications of political ecology and post-foundational politics for contemporary architectural and urban practices. They are the authors of:

- ’Superpowers of Scale’. Columbia Press. 2020
- 'Mies y la gata Niebla. Ensayos sobre arquitectura y cosmopolítica'. Puente Editores. 2018
- ’More-Than-Human’ With M. Otero and L. Pietroiusti. Idea Books. 2020
- 'PHANTOM. Mies as Rendered Society'. Fundació Mies van der Rohe 2013.
- ‘Andrés Jaque. Everyday Politics’. EA! Ediciones. 2011.
- ‘Dulces Arenas Cotidianas’. Lugadero. 2013.
- 'Calculable-Transmaterial'. ARQ. 2017.
- 'Different Kinds of Water Pouring Into A Swimming Pool'. RedCat CalArts. 2014

Jaque has made regular contributions to both specialized and general media. With significant publications in leading architectural magazines such as El Croquis, Domus, Perspecta Yale, Thresholds Journal MIT, Log, Volume and Beyond; and regular works for broader audiences, including Babelia, the cultural supplement of El País, and La SER radio station where Jaque holds a regular participation on architectural and urban concerns. From 2013 to 2016 he published the periodic column "Cuarto de estar en la galaxia" in El País Senanal.

== Film ==
- ’Sales Oddity. Milano 2 and the politics of direct-to-home TV-urbanism’ Silver Lion to the Best Project, 2014 Venice Biennale. Milano. 2014
- ’Intimate Strangers. The archiurbanisms of hook-up locative media’. London. 2016
- ’Pornified Homes’. Oslo. 2018
- ’The Transscalar Architecture of Covid 19’ Andrés Jaque and Iván L. Munuera. 2020
