= Mariam Issoufou =

Nigerien architect (born 1979)

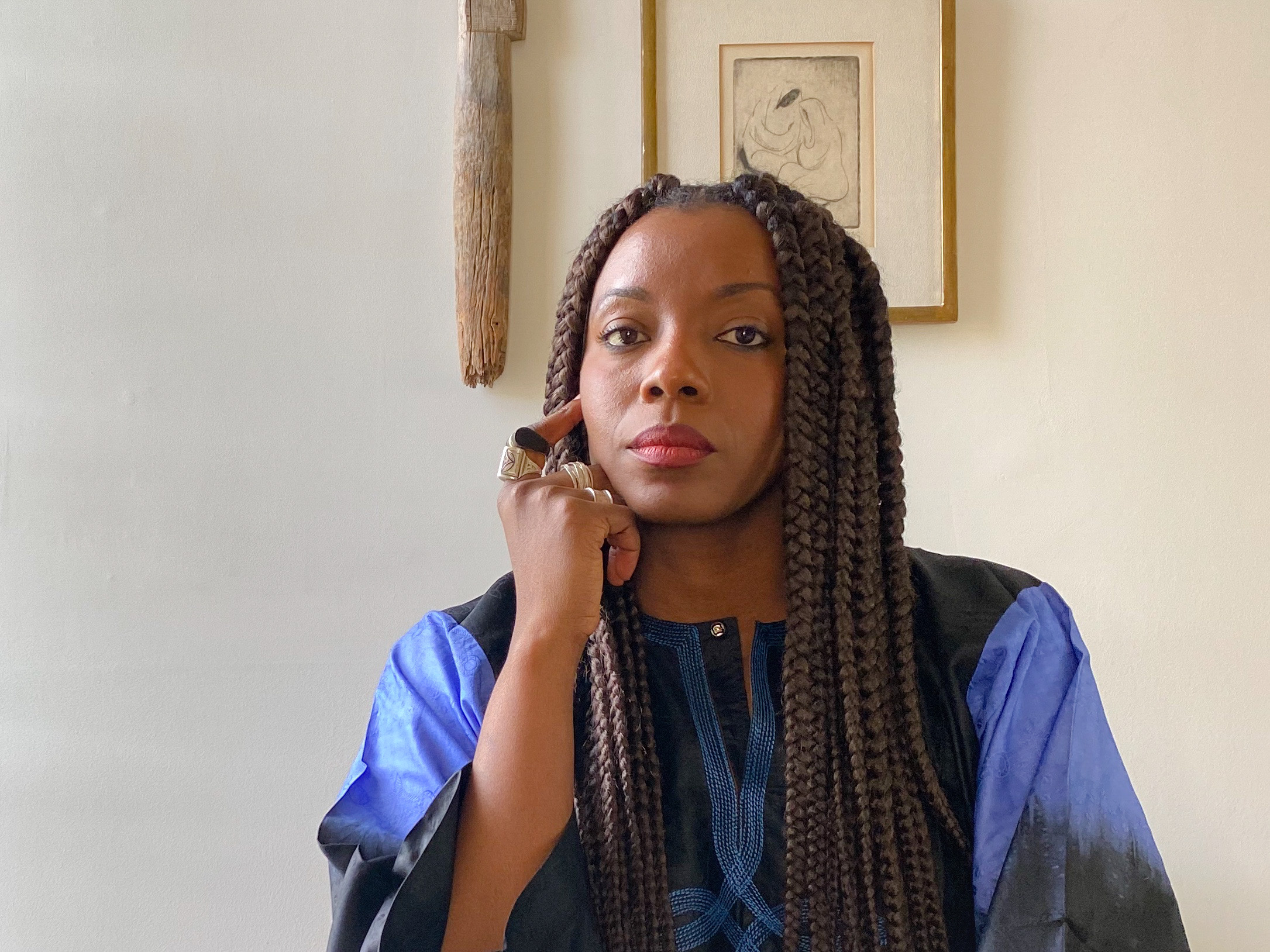
- Born: April 1979 (age 46–47); Saint-Étienne, France
- Education: Purdue University; New York University; University of Washington
- Occupation: Architect
- Website: Mariam Issoufou Architects (formerly atelier masōmī)

Mariam Issoufou (born April 1979) or Mariam Issoufou Mahamadou, formerly known as Mariam (Issoufou) Kamara, is a Nigerien architect. Her designs focus on open living spaces and make use of locally produced materials available to African communities: cement, recycled metal and raw earth.

== Biography ==
Mariam Issoufou was born in April 1979 in Saint-Étienne, France.

Issoufou's first career ambition was to become a computer engineer, for which she earned a Purdue University bachelor's degree in technical computing (2001) and then a master's degree in computer science from New York University (2004). She worked in the computing field for seven years before deciding to change careers and become an architect to fulfill her teenage ambition.

In 2013, Issoufou earned her master's degree in architecture from the University of Washington. Her thesis, Mobile Loitering, focuses on gender issues in Niger's public spaces. Her master's work was exhibited at the Triennale di Milano in 2014 at the Africa Big Chance Big Change exhibition.

=== Professional career ===
She co-founded the architectural group united4design (2013) while still living in the United States, and on her return to Niger she established an architecture and research firm called Atelier Masomi (2014), which focuses on open living spaces in local architecture.

The international collective of architects participating in United4design worked on projects in the United States, Afghanistan and Niger. Issoufou's designs feature buildings with geometric shapes and rely on three locally produced materials available to many communities: cement, recycled metal and raw earth.

In 2017, she taught urban studies as an adjunct associate professor at Brown University in Rhode Island.

In 2022, Issoufou was appointed as Full Professor of Architecture Heritage and Sustainability at ETH Zurich in Switzerland. In 2024, she was part of the multidisciplinary advisory committee for the inaugural Ammodo Architecture Awards.

=== Major projects ===
==== Niamey 2000 ====
Her first major project was Niamey 2000, an apartment complex built in 2016 and designed in collaboration with Yasaman Esmaili, Elizabeth Golden and Philip Sträter. The project addresses the spatial problems linked to the concrete structure of Issoufou's childhood home built in Niamey in the 1960s.

The result is four structures made by combining earth and cement fitted together. A notable feature is a bench in the front that allows the reintroduction of the traditional faada - local gatherings of friends and family that routinely occur in the space between the house and the street, which is also a historical gathering place.

Niamey 2000 was one of twenty projects shortlisted for the Aga Khan Award for Architecture in 2022.

==== Hikma en Dandaji ====
In 2018, she worked again with Yasaman Esmaili to produce the project Hikma ("wisdom" in Arabic) in Dandaji, which is in the Tahoua region of Niger. Inspired by the rammed earth building technique, the project is a cultural complex that includes a mosque, library and community center. Their work combines the two types of knowledge "without contradiction, between secular knowledge and faith." For each project, Issoufou's preparation is key.

For each of her achievements, Issoufou conducts field surveys in order to better understand the expectations of future inhabitants: how do they live and how do they receive? How comfortable will they be, culturally at ease? What will allow them to lower the temperature inside their house? The Legacy Restored Center project thus required six months of observations. As a result, it offers a citizen space open to all inhabitants of the village of Dandaji, promotes the education of women and strengthens their presence in the community.

The project won two awards at the Lafarge Holcim Awards (2017), the largest competition of sustainable architecture of the world.

==== Niamey Cultural Center ====
Issoufou is working with the British architect of Ghanaian origin, David Adjaye, to plan a new cultural center in Niamey. However, the 2023 Nigerien coup d'état stalled progress, with realisation of the plans now reportedly "unlikely."

==== Ellen Johnson Sirleaf Presidential Center ====
As of 2024, Issoufou is working on designs for the Ellen Johnson Sirleaf Presidential Center for Women and Development in Monrovia, Liberia. The site will be made up of tall, steeply pitched buildings, and constructed with aw earth bricks, fired clay bricks, rubberwood and palm leaves; Issoufou was inspired by Liberia's traditional palava huts and the mats of woven palm leaves made by local women.

==== Bët-bi Museum ====
In May 2022, Issoufou was selected by a jury to lead the design of the new Bët-bi museum in Senegal. The project will be supported by the Josef and Anni Albers Foundation and its sister-organisation Le Korsa, and is set to open in 2025.

== Awards received ==
- 2016: American Institute of Architects (AIA) Seattle Merit Award
- 2017: LafargeHolcim Award for Sustainable Construction:
  - Silver medal in the Global category
  - Gold medal in the Middle East Africa regional category
- 2017: Architect Magazine R+D Award
- 2018: Rolex Mentor and Protégé Arts Initiative, enabling her to collaborate with architect David Adjaye
- 2019: Prince Claus Prize in the Netherlands
- 2019: The Royal Academy (RA) Dorfman Awards finalist
- 2020: Moira Gemmill Prize for Emerging Architecture, Highly Commended and Shortlisted
- 2023: Architizer Impact in Design Award
- 2025: Prix Roux Dorlut [fr] of the French Academy of Architecture, rewarding "an oeuvre particularly integrated or in poetic osmosis with the landscape".
- 2025: Iconic Awards – Creator of the Year
- 2025: UN Champion of the Earth for Entrepreneurial Vision — "By grounding her architecture in local materials and cultural heritage, Ms. Issoufou is redefining sustainable, climate-resilient buildings across the Sahel and inspiring a new generation of designers shaping Africa’s built environment. Through projects like the Hikma Community Complex in Niger, she pioneers passive cooling techniques that keep buildings up to 10°C cooler without air conditioning."

== Selected work ==
- Kamara, Mariam. Mobile Loitering: A response to public space needs in Niger's post-colonial, highly gendered urban context. Diss. 2014.
