= Department of Architecture, University of Cambridge =

UK academic department

University of Cambridge Department of Architecture
- Type: Public
- Established: 1912
- Head of Department: Prof Flora Samuel
- Academic staff: 48
- Undergraduates: 190
- Postgraduates: 145
- Location: 1 Scroope Terrace, Cambridge, United Kingdom
- Campus: Urban
- Website: arct.cam.ac.uk CDRS

The Department of Architecture is part of the Faculty of Architecture and History of Art in the University of Cambridge. Both Departments are housed in Scroope Terrace on Trumpington Street, Cambridge.

The department is currently led by Flora Samuel.

== Notable alumni and staff ==
The department has attracted numerous guest lecturers including Louis Kahn, Zaha Hadid, Kenneth Frampton, Alvar Aalto, Le Corbusier and Yasmeen Lari.

=== Alumni ===
- Christopher Alexander, architect, co-author of A Pattern Language
- Anthony Armstrong-Jones, Lord Snowdon, photographer
- Joanna Bacon
- Peter Clegg (Stirling Prize, 2008)
- Catherine Cooke, architect and Russian scholar
- Dora Cosens
- Edward Cullinan (RIBA Gold Medal, 2008)
- Spencer de Grey, architect, Head of Design Foster and Partners
- Philip Dowson (RIBA Gold Medal, 1981)
- Peter Eisenman
- Richard Feilden
- Prince Richard, Duke of Gloucester
- Vaughan Hart, architectural historian
- Robert Hurd
- Sumet Jumsai
- Patrick Lynch, architect, founder Lynch Architects
- Richard MacCormac, architect, founder of MJP Architects
- Lionel March
- James Mason
- Raymond McGrath
- Rowan Moore, architecture correspondent for The Observer
- Christopher Nicholson
- Eric Parry
- Sunand Prasad (RIBA President, 2007–09)
- Cedric Price
- Colin St John Wilson
- Colin Stansfield Smith (RIBA Gold Medal, 1991)
- Robert Tavernor
- Brenda and Robert Vale
- Sarah Wigglesworth
- Ken Yeang
- Keith Griffiths, founder of Aedas

=== Current and former staff ===
- Bob Allies
- Peter Blundell Jones
- Peter Bicknell
- Hugh Casson
- George Checkley
- Peter Clegg (Stirling Prize, 2008)
- Charles Correa (RIBA Gold Medal, 1984)
- Frank Duffy (RIBA President, 1993–95)
- Peter Eisenmann
- Max Fordham
- Dean Hawkes
- Felipe Hernandez
- Deborah Howard
- Henry Castree Hughes
- David Leatherbarrow
- Richard MacCormac (RIBA President, 1991-93)
- Sebastian Macmillan
- Leslie Martin (RIBA Gold Medal, 1973)
- Bruce Martin
- Mohsen Mostafavi
- Eric Parry
- Edward Prior
- David Roberts
- Colin Rowe (RIBA Gold Medal, 1995)
- Joseph Rykwert
- Andrew Saint
- Peter Salter
- Colin St John Wilson
- James Stirling (Pritzker Prize Laureate)
- Dalibor Vesely
- Matteo Zallio

== ARCSOC ==
ARCSOC is the Department's Architecture Society, hosting club nights, as well as guest lectures and highly popular life-drawing evenings. The society entirely self-funds, organises, and designs the Department's end-of-year exhibition, typically held in London. Reviewing the 2017 edition held at Bargehouse OXO Tower for the Architects' Journal, James Soane praised the "skilful explorations of materiality and narrative" on display. In 2024 the end-of-year exhibition returns to Cambridge and will be held in the Department and Kettle's Yard.
