= Galliard Homes =

British residential property developer

Galliard Homes Limited
- Formerly: Famegeneral Limited (1987 – 1987); Margin Finance Securities Limited (1987 – 1992)
- Type: Private
- Industry: Residential property
- Founded: August 28, 1987; 39 years ago
- Headquarters: Loughton, England, UK
- Key people: Stephen Conway (founder, non-executive chairman, former CEO), Eli Dias (CEO)
- Website: www.galliardhomes.com

Galliard Homes Limited is a British residential property developer based in Loughton, England. Operating across London and the Home Counties, Galliard Homes is the capital's largest privately owned residential property developer.

== History ==
Galliard Homes was founded in 1992, by Stephen Conway. He stepped down as CEO in 2017, but resumed the role between December 2021 and 31 March 2025. He is currently non-executive chairman of the company.

In July 2015, Singaporean developer, Oxley Holdings entered into a subscription and shareholders' agreement to acquire a 20% stake in the enlarged share capital of Galliard for £50m.

Galliard appeared on BBC One's The Apprentice in December 2015, with contestants trying to sell off-plan apartments at The Printworks in Clapham.

In September 2016 Galliard's Lincoln Plaza development in London's Docklands won the Carbuncle Cup for the worst new building of the year in the UK.

During April 2023, Galliard announced it had signed the UK government's post-Grenfell remediation contract, intended to ensure developers tackle critical fire safety defects in buildings that are 11 metres or taller and built in the past 30 years. The company had been criticised in March 2023 by housing minister Michael Gove for being "most recalcitrant" and for briefing against legislation to end the cladding scandal.

=== Caxton Works ===
In late 2026, residents of five blocks of apartments in the Caxton Works development (also known as Royal Gateway) in east London's Canning Town were forced to evacuate due to structural engineering issues in the buildings, designed by architects Studio Egret West and completed by Galliard and Cathedral Group in 2018 (it received a 2018 New London Award in the Built – Mixed Use category in 2018). Over 200 households were evacuated from Centurion Tower, Sovereign Tower and St Vincent's Court on 22–23 October. A week later, residents and businesses at Thanet Tower and Prince Court were also told to leave over fears that the problems "could result in a collapse" and posed an "imminent risk to life". Newham Council served Dangerous Structural Notices for the towers; over 330 households had to find and pay for their own alternative accommodation (often while also continuing to pay mortgages on the vacated properties) as Galliard had not accepted responsibility; several businesses, including a restaurant and a children's nursery, had to close, while the buildings' managers could give no date for a possible return. Galliard Homes said it was working with independent structural engineers to investigate the problems, and said its focus was "on helping to establish a safe and effective solution that enables residents to return to their homes as soon as it is safe to do so." It subsequently said it would reimburse relocation costs for residents impacted by the evacuations. Four weeks after the initial evacuations (19 November 2026), hundreds of residents remained homeless, and an industry commentator wondered "whether buildings should enter architectural awards before their safety has been independently verified".

In November it was reported that Galliard CEO Eli Dias had sold his own penthouse apartment in the Caxton Works development months before the evacuations, shortly after initial inquiries had been made about the construction. Dias has denied knowing anything about the structural issues before selling.

== Operations ==
With over 700 staff, Galliard is a property development, hospitality and management group overseeing mixed-use residential, hotel and commercial projects across London and southern England, with a £3.6 billion portfolio of over 6,000 homes, 950 hotel rooms, and one million square feet of retail premises and commercial properties. The Group has three divisions, Galliard Homes, Galliard Commercial and Galliard Construction.

A 1999 legal case, Galliard Homes v J Jarvis and Sons, is relevant to the interpretation of letters of intent, pre-contractual documents issued in order to set a project underway. In this case, the formal contract documents were never signed, and a dispute arose regarding the project. The High Court held that the intention of both parties had been to enter into a formal contract executed as a deed, but this did not take place and there was therefore no contract in place.

=== Developments ===
- Burrells Wharf, London
- Great Jubilee Wharf, Wapping, London
- Millennium Quay, London
- The Chilterns, London - in 2011, with Frogmore, Galliard acquired a site on Chiltern Street in Marylebone and began developing apartments now known as The Chilterns.
- The Stage, Shoreditch
- Morden Wharf, London - in November 2023, Galliard Homes, in a joint venture with Singaporean partner City Developments Limited, acquired the 13.8-acre Morden Wharf development in Greenwich. Planning permission was granted in April 2026 for a 1,500-home residential scheme, including 20% affordable housing, in 11 blocks with the tallest being 35 storeys high, and 186,300 sq ft of commercial floorspace, car and cycle parking, public realm and open space.
