= The Marque, Cambridge =

Residential building in Cambridge, England

Coordinates: 52.188°N 0.137°E

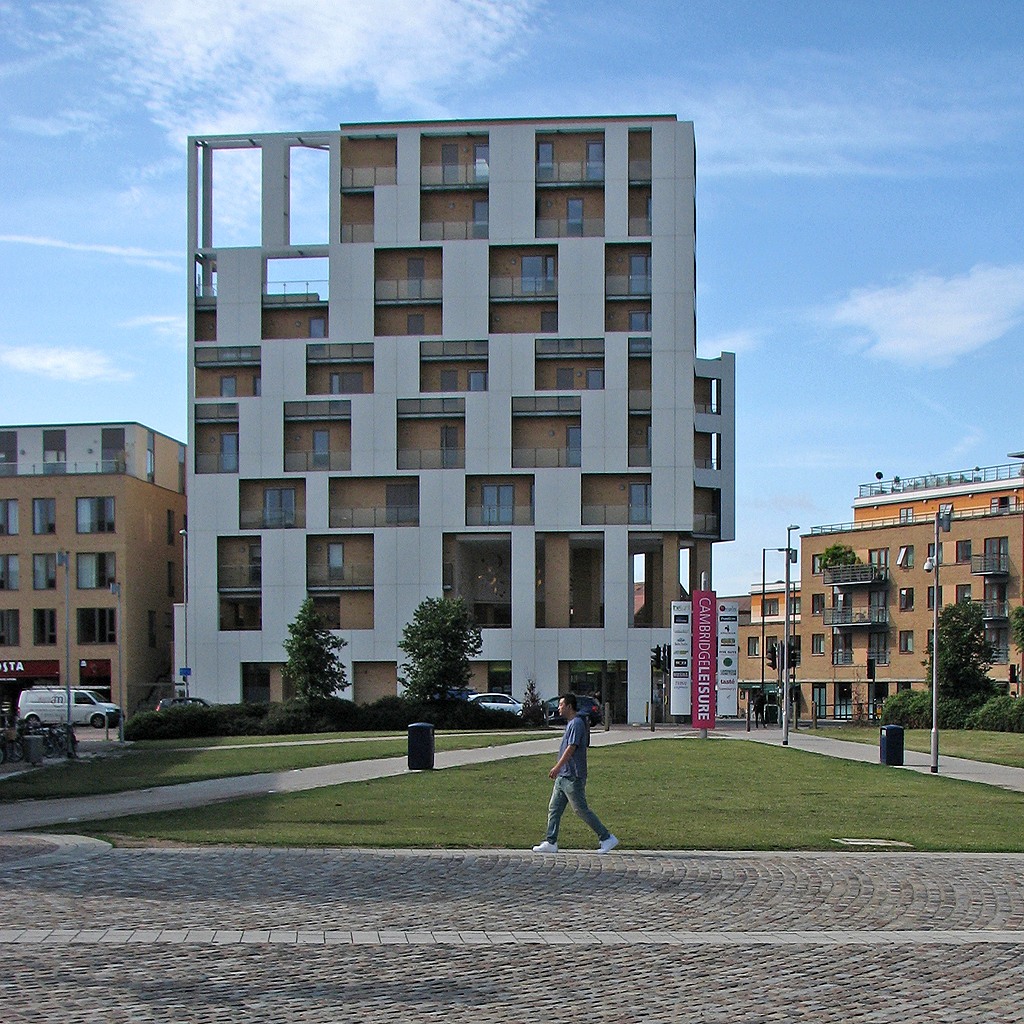
The Marque

The Marque is the tallest residential development in Cambridge, England. The building is nine storeys tall and overall the development comprises 130 apartments.

The three-floor penthouse is the highest residence in the city and is 2,697 square feet (250.6 m^{2}). It was priced at £1.3 million, sold to a Chinese investor who immediately sold it on to a British buyer.

The building made the shortlist for the 2014 Carbuncle Cup for the ugliest building of the year.
