= 22 Bishopsgate =

Commercial skyscraper in London, England

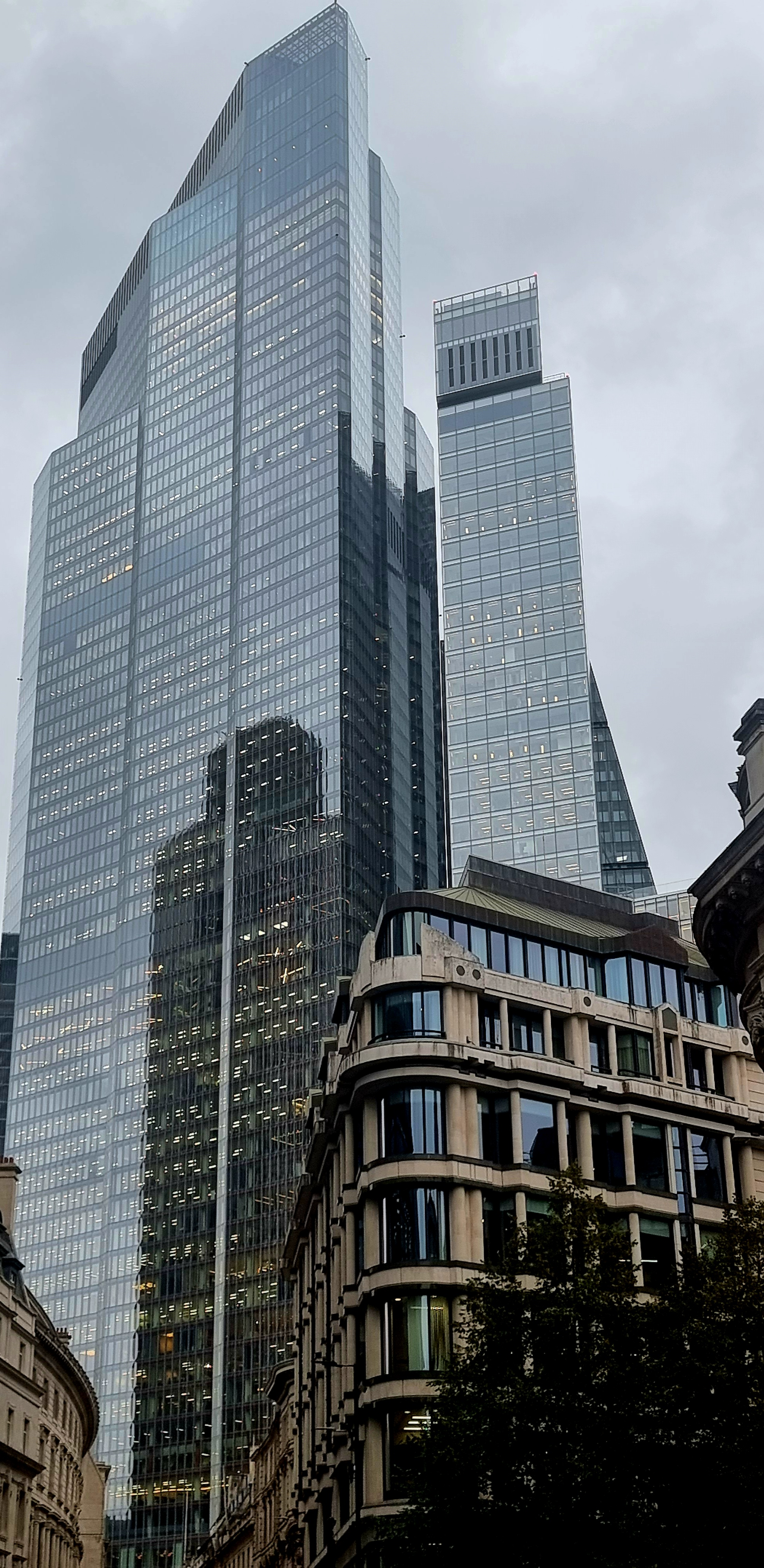
- 22 Bishopsgate

- Location within Greater London

General information
- Status: Completed
- Location: London, England, UK
- Coordinates: 51.5145°N 0.0829°W
- Construction started: Late 2016 (redesign version)
- Completed: 2020

Height
- Roof: 278 m (912 ft)

Technical details
- Floor count: 62

Design and construction
- Architect: PLP Architecture
- Structural engineer: WSP
- Services engineer: WSP
- Main contractor: Multiplex

Website
- 22bishopsgate.com

22 Bishopsgate is a commercial skyscraper in London, England. Completed in 2020, it is located in Bishopsgate, in the City of London financial district, and stands 278 m (912 ft) tall with 62 storeys. It replaced an earlier plan for a 288 m (945 ft) tower named The Pinnacle, on which construction was started in 2008 but suspended in 2012 following the Great Recession, with only the concrete core of the first seven storeys completed. The structure was later re-designed to reduce construction costs, and was re-named after its postal address, 22 Bishopsgate. It is the second tallest building in the United Kingdom and the seventeenth tallest building in Europe.

Under the original plans, The Pinnacle was to become the second-tallest building in both the United Kingdom and the European Union after The Shard, also in London. The Economic Development Corporation of Saudi Arabia and its development manager, Arab Investments, which largely funded the construction, invested £500 million in it in return for a majority stake in the structure. However, the build was put on hold due to a lack of additional funding and letting commitments.

In 2013 it was reported that a review of the design and construction process, undertaken by original architects Kohn Pedersen Fox, agents CBRE and the developers, had been completed, with the building's "helter skelter" style exterior set to be retained. In 2015, the site was sold to a consortium led by Axa Real Estate and a re-design with a simpler exterior, ultimately excluding the costly "helter skelter" shape, was submitted for public consultation before application for planning permission.

In April 2016, it was confirmed that property company Lipton Rogers and its joint venture partner, Axa IM – Real Assets, would complete the £1bn development in 2019. At 278 metres, the building was set to be the tallest in the City of London at that time and, due to potential loss of light to surrounding buildings, there had been objections to the development from several parties. However, the City of London granted permission after considering the potential benefits of developing the building including the introduction of more floorspace to the area and the creation of new jobs.

In 2017, plans were approved which redesigned the building and reduced its height further to 255 m due to concerns that the cranes used for its construction could interfere with the flight paths of the nearby London City Airport. However, these plans were withdrawn after approval was granted for the previous 278-metre design.

== Original plan and design ==
The architects of The Pinnacle were Kohn Pedersen Fox and the developer was the fund management company Union Investment. The height of the tower was initially proposed at 307 metres (1,007 ft), but this was scaled down to 288 metres (945 ft) following concerns from the Civil Aviation Authority. The revised design included approximately 88,000 square metres (947,200 sq ft) of office space.

The Bishopsgate Tower, as it was first called, was submitted for planning permission in June 2005 and approved in April 2006. The twisting design of its roof and the curling patterns in the façade were based on various organic forms in nature such as armadillos, mushrooms and seashells, and led to the building being nicknamed "The Helter Skelter". The upper floors were to contain restaurants and the highest public viewing platform in the UK.

The Pinnacle's original design also provided more solar panelling than any other building in the country, with 2,000 square metres (21,500 sq ft) of photovoltaic cells, capable of generating up to 200 kW of electricity. It would also have had a double-layered skin like the nearby gherkin-shaped 30 St Mary Axe, allowing it to respond dynamically to climatic changes and to utilise effective climate control with low energy consumption. To control construction costs, every panel on the tower would be of exactly the same size.

In August 2006 Keltbray began test-piling on site. Demolition began on the smaller of the two existing buildings in November 2006. In February 2007 it was reported that the Bishopsgate Tower had been purchased by Arab Investments, and that the structure would be renamed as The Pinnacle.

In May 2007 it was announced that full funding had been secured and that The Pinnacle was likely to be built speculatively. In June 2007 demolition began on Crosby Court, the larger of the two existing buildings on the site.

In August 2007 Arab Investments signed a pre-construction contract with Multiplex to build the tower.

== Sustainability ==
22 Bishopsgate's environmental, social, and governance policy, ESG, states that the building was envisioned to be engineered for optimum sustainability. The building management has goals to limit waste and energy use within the large structure, including care in what they purchase as the building is occupied by tenants: "The 22 Team work to a set of circular economy principles and innovative logistics, built to reduce waste and make the smallest impact possible on the spaces around us."

== Demolition of previous buildings ==
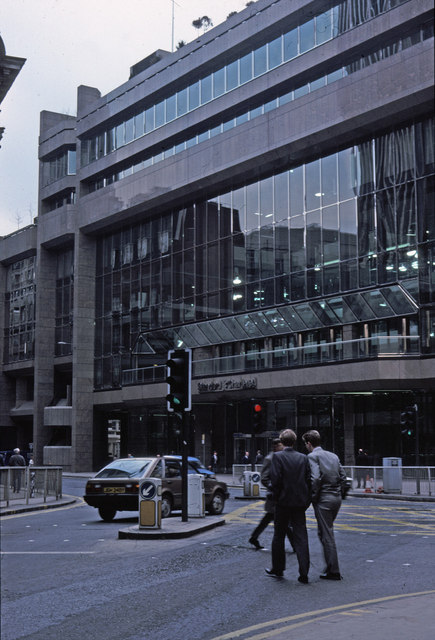
One of the two previous buildings on the site, pictured shortly after opening in 1986. Crosby Court at 38 Bishopsgate, at the junction with Threadneedle Street, was once the headquarters of Standard Chartered.

Demolition of the existing site began in mid-2007. It was scheduled to be completed by February 2008, however this was delayed until April 2008 because of an injunction won in December 2007 by Hiscox, an insurance company based in neighbouring Great St. Helen's. The company complained about noise pollution from the work. The injunction obtained by Hiscox Syndicates & Another against The Pinnacle Ltd & Others in January 2008 afforded protection on three points:

1. protection of the right of access to the car park entrance from Crosby Square;
2. protection from water ingress;
3. protection from vibration by way of set PPV (peak particle velocity) limits at certain times during the working day.

The injunction was successfully varied at a hearing in June 2008. An application to vary the terms of the injunction in connection with access was granted and a new Order made by the Technology and Construction Court.

Alternative access across the site ensured that access to the car park entrance was maintained whilst demolition above and adjacent to the highway continued.

Demolition was completed by June 2008.

== Initial construction ==
In late May 2008, a mobile crane and piling rig were on site preparing for construction. It was reported that law firm Davies Arnold Cooper was to take up 80,000 sq ft (7,400 m^{2}) of office space, and subsequently that the restaurant which was to be at the top of the tower was let. The tower was well under construction, with steel rebar cages already inserted into the ground, which formed part of the piles that would hold the weight of the tower. In November 2008, another piling rig came into use on the site, as well as steel plates for the piles.

By March 2009, the longest piles in the UK had been laid. The previous record holder was Moor House with foundations 57 metres (190 ft) deep. They were sunk 48.5 metres (159 ft) below sea level, and 65.5 metres (215 ft) below ground level.

In Summer 2009, piling had been completed and workers began excavating deep down, ready to begin constructing the basements. The first crane base was put into place in October 2009.

At some point construction work had stopped when, in June 2011, Arab Investments announced that they had secured the nearly £500 million (equivalent to £703.80 million in 2024) shortfall in the project, meaning that construction work could resume, and by December 2011 the core had reached the sixth floor. A £140 million loan was provided by HSH Nordbank which was subsequently extended three times.

In March 2012 the project was halted until at least early 2013, due to problems regarding the pre-let (an agreement, important to secure financing during construction of large commercial projects, to enter into a lease at a date in the future). In December 2012 a settlement offered by Arab Investments to contractors Brookfield Multiplex paved the way for construction to resume "potentially very soon". However, in February 2013 it was reported that the part-built skyscraper could be demolished and rebuilt from scratch based on a less expensive scheme. The following month it was understood that several architects had submitted bids to re-design The Pinnacle, including Ken Shuttleworth, the co-designer of 30 St Mary Axe.

In April 2013 it was suggested that The Pinnacle would not restart construction under its original design. However, by December 2013, after an extensive design review, alterations to the interior floor plans were made but the costly exterior was retained with no significant changes.

== Sale and redesign ==
In February 2015 the site was acquired by a consortium led by Axa Real Estate in a deal worth £550 million. The building was completely redesigned and a new application for planning permission was submitted in summer 2015 following consultation. That application was approved in November 2015. The concrete central core of the original design was completely removed by December 2015, and construction of the new building commenced in January 2016.

The new building, renamed as 22 Bishopsgate, is planned to be 278 m (912 ft) tall with 62 storeys. It is estimated the tower will provide approximately 120,000 square metres (1,291,700 sq ft) of office space and 4,000 square metres (43,100 sq ft) for restaurants, retail outlets and viewing galleries.

During the EU Referendum campaign, the developer, Axa, had stated that while they were "committed to the development", they may "revisit the options" if there was a vote to leave the EU. However, despite the leave vote on 23 June, construction continued.

In November 2016, a new planning application was submitted which slightly altered the design of the proposed building, as well as reducing its height by 23 metres and to 59 floors to allow for "a cleaner, more elegant resolution to the top of the building in the context of air-traffic control constraints". The application was approved in February 2017. However, these plans were withdrawn, with the developer confirming that the 62-storey, 278 m scheme will be built.

During 2017, a suspended girder from the 22 Bishopsgate site struck nearby Leadenhall Tower. Severfield was the steel frame subcontractor to Multiplex's Bishopsgate site. Nobody was hurt.

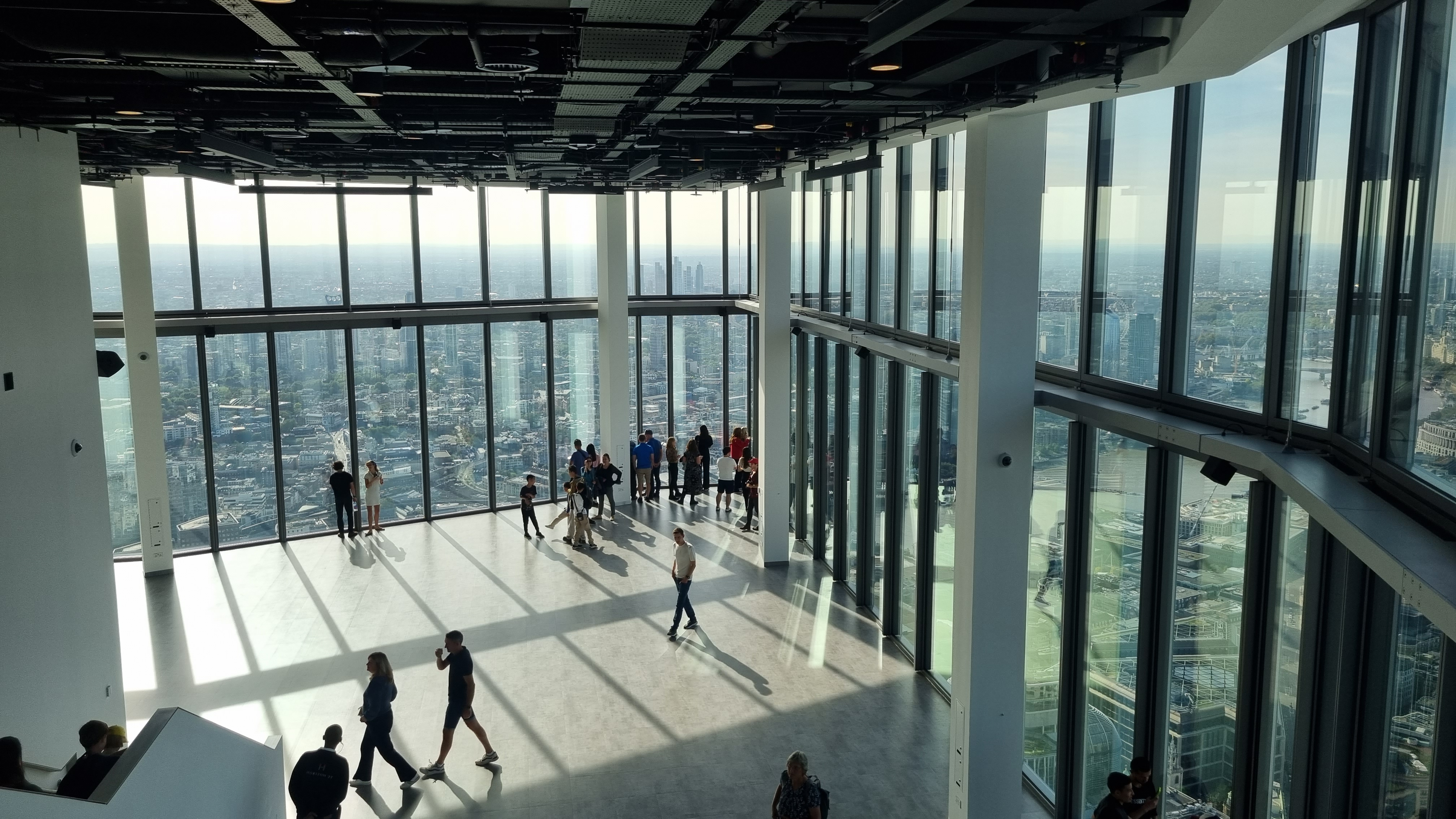
"Horizon 22", the viewing gallery at 22 Bishopsgate

== Initial tenants and facilities ==
22 Bishopsgate is a mixed-use building with 61 levels, the majority of which are office spaces leased to various companies. In addition, the building houses a bike park for over 1,000 bicycles, a food 'marketplace', a public gym (which includes a glass climbing wall overlooking London) and a free public viewing gallery on the 58th floor at 254 metres – the highest viewing gallery in the UK and the highest free viewing gallery in Europe. Tickets are free as a condition of the planning permission for the skyscraper granted by the City of London.

== Gallery ==
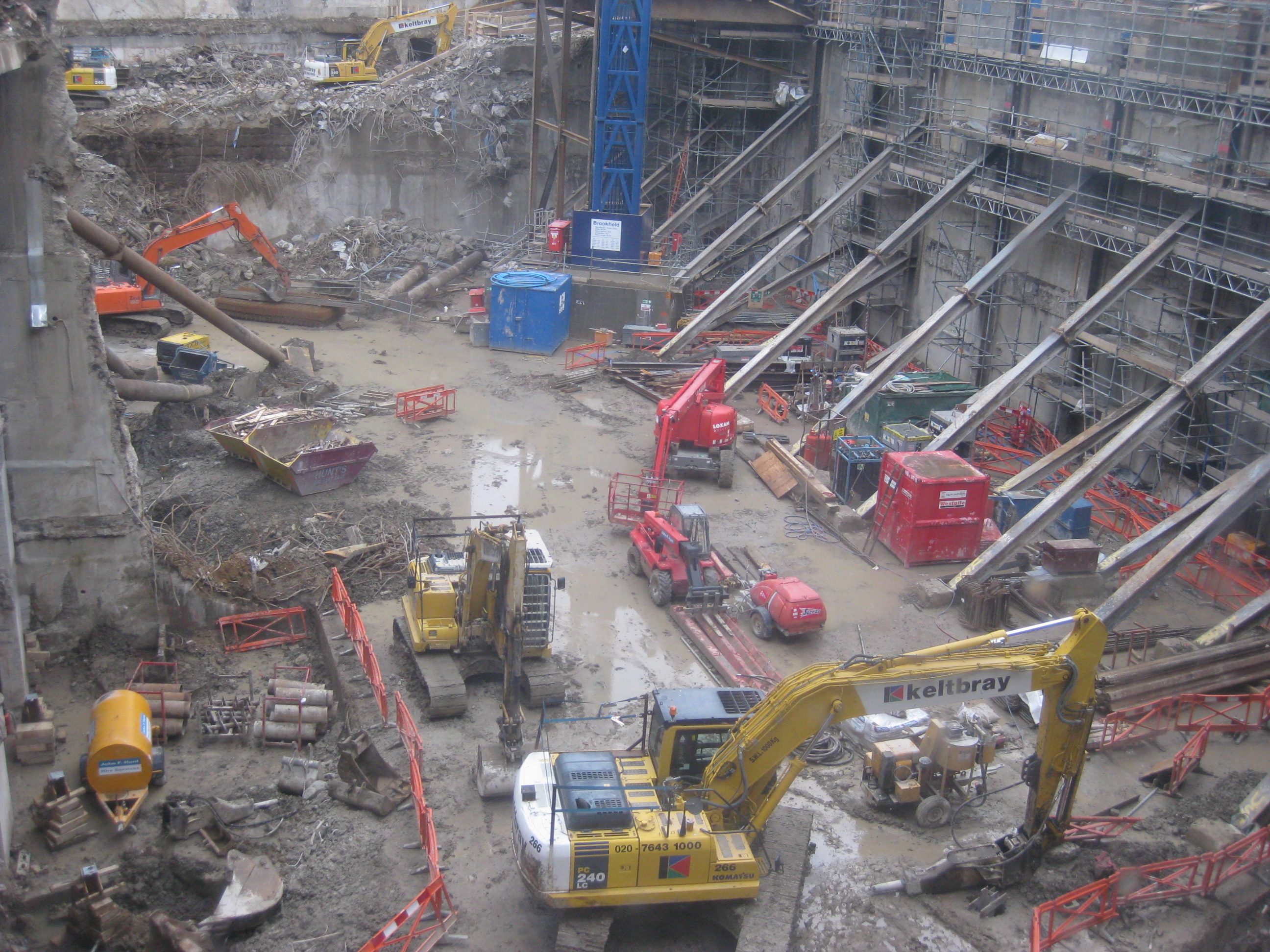
The Pinnacle site, December 2009

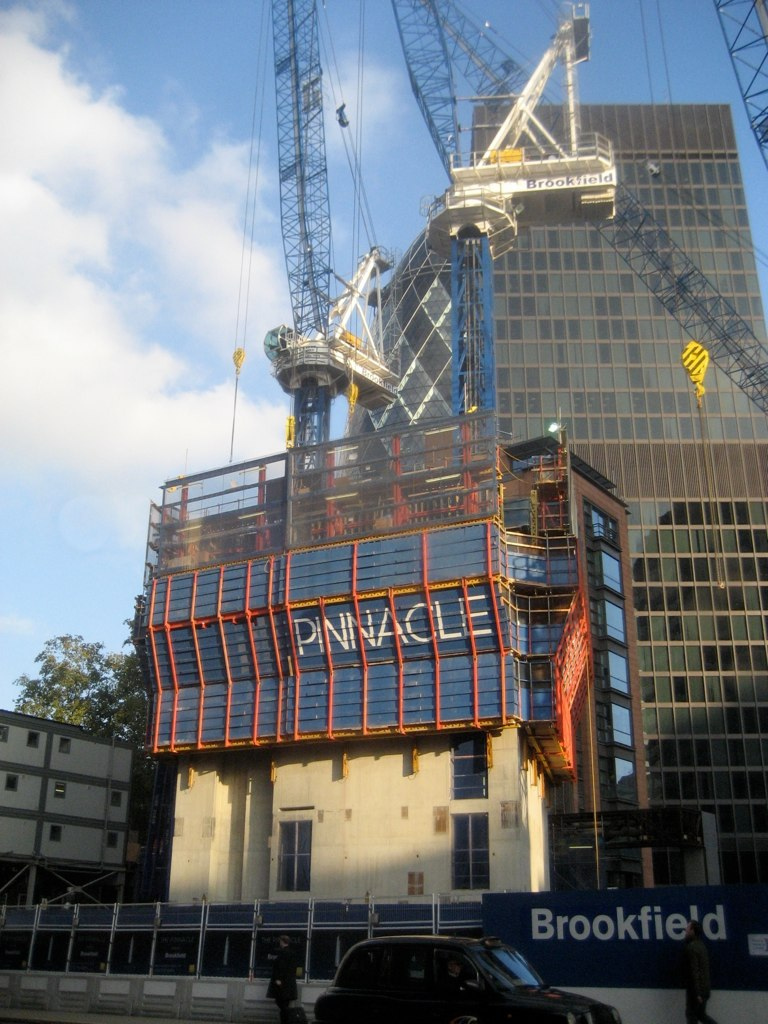
The Pinnacle site, November 2010

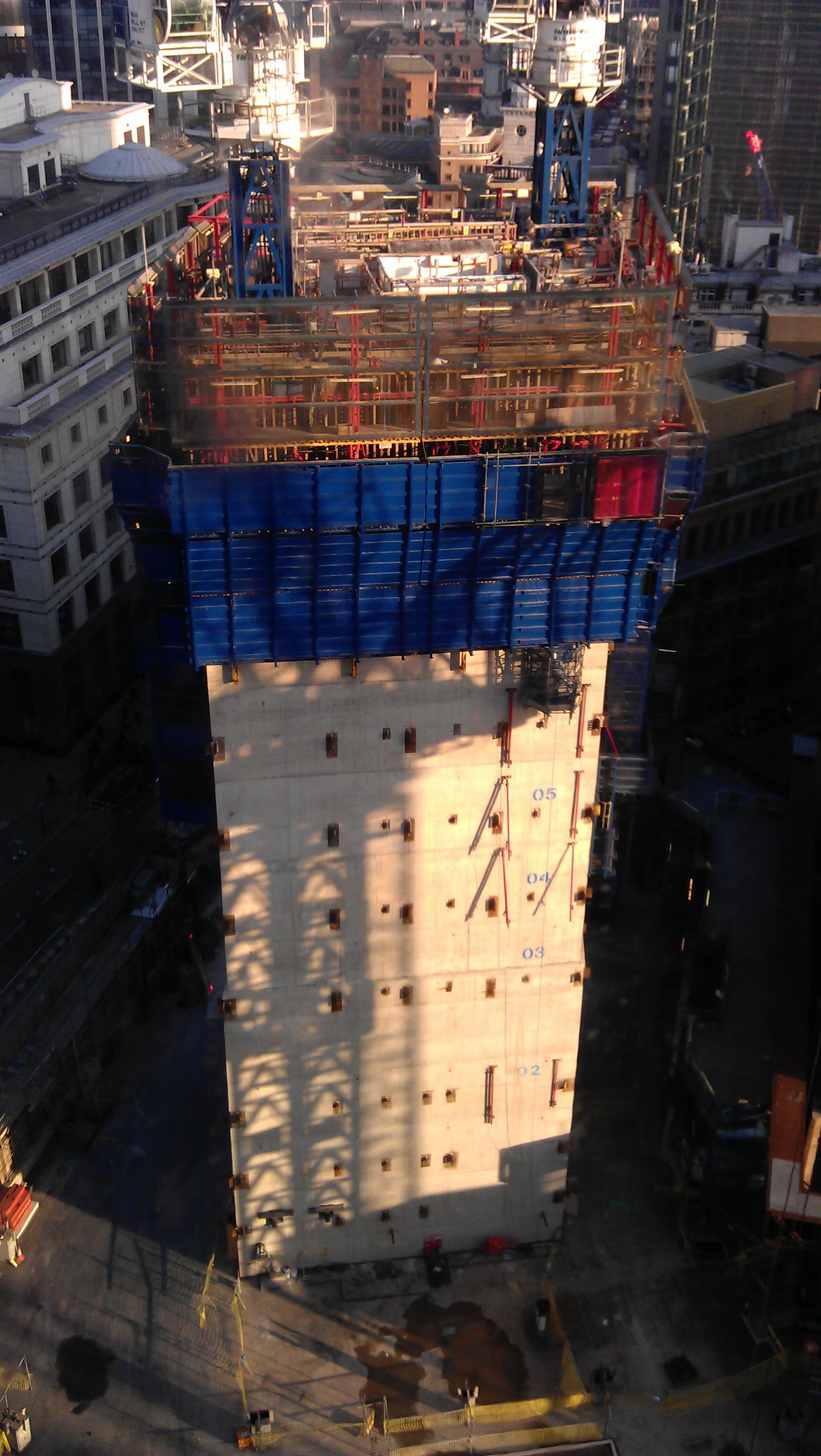
The Pinnacle site, February 2012

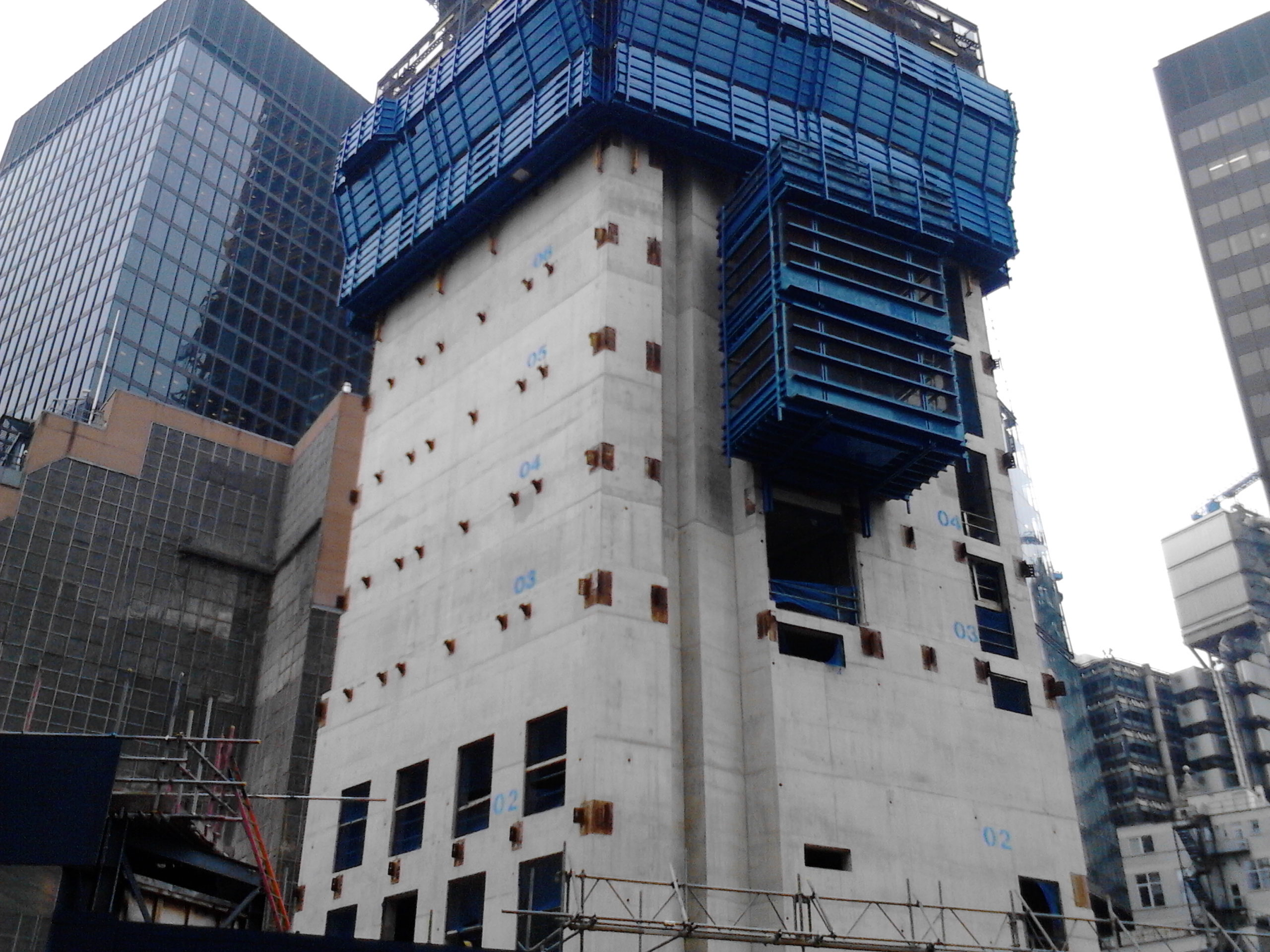
The Pinnacle site, March 2013

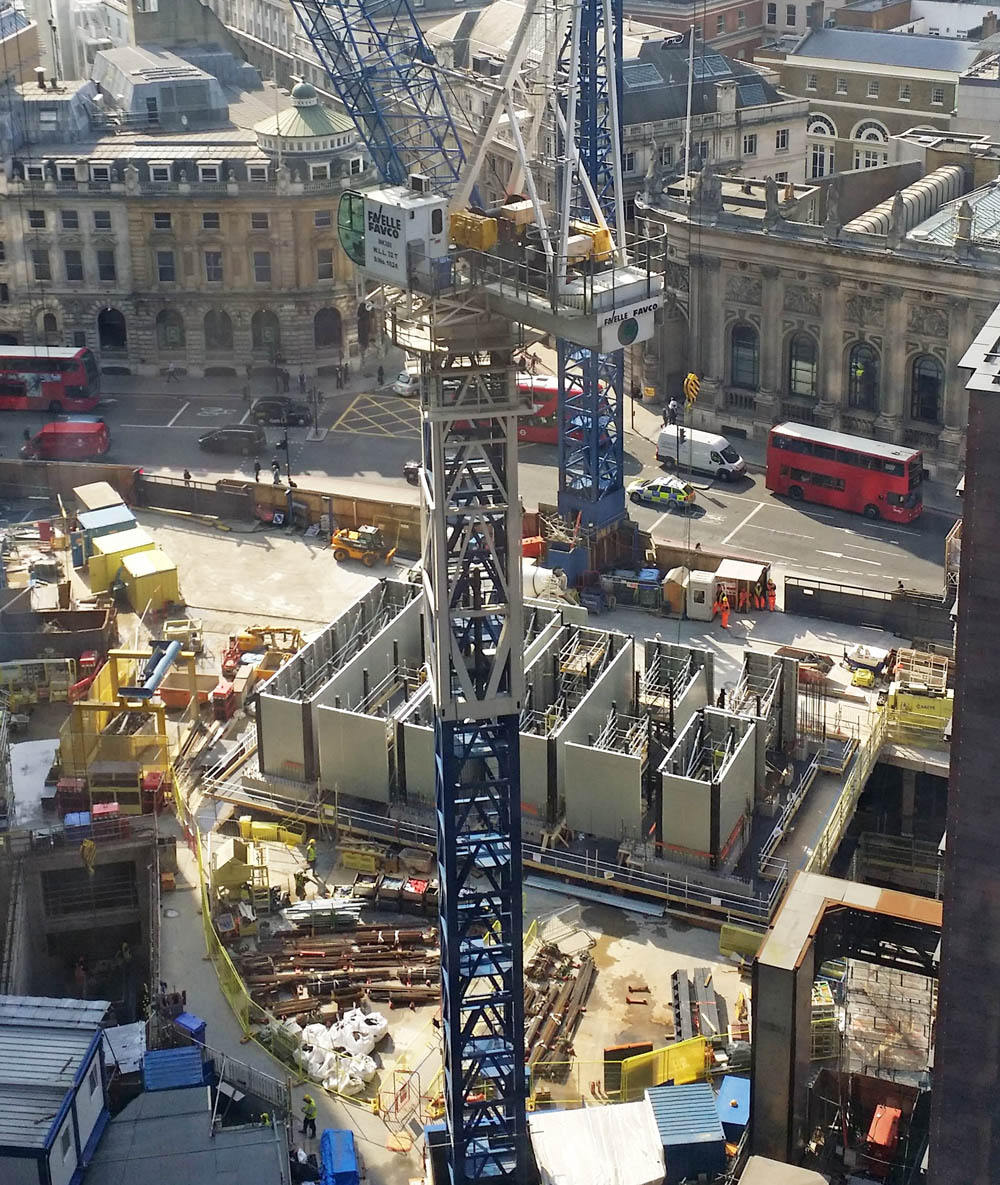
22 Bishopsgate site, May 2016

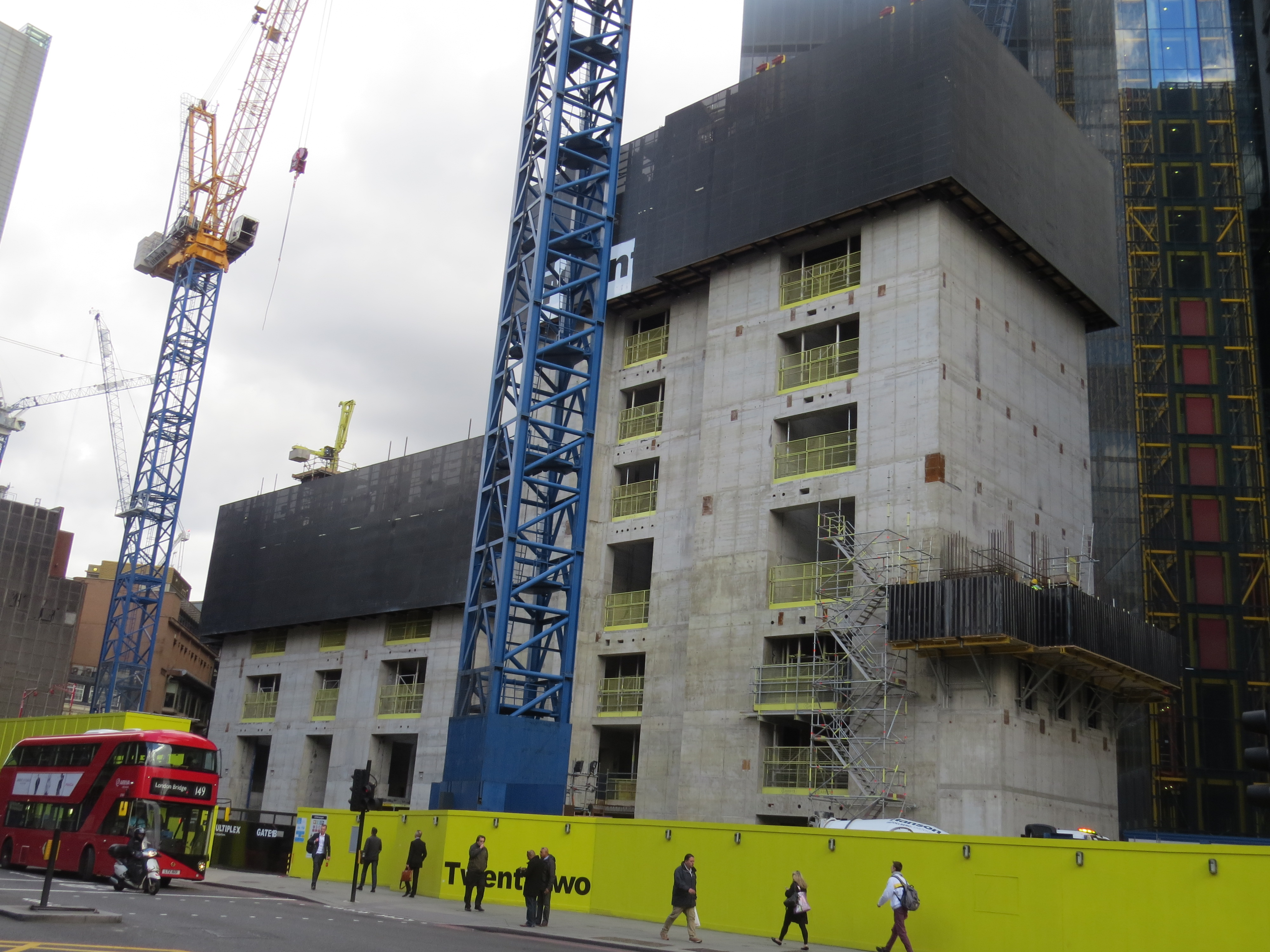
22 Bishopsgate site, Oct 2016

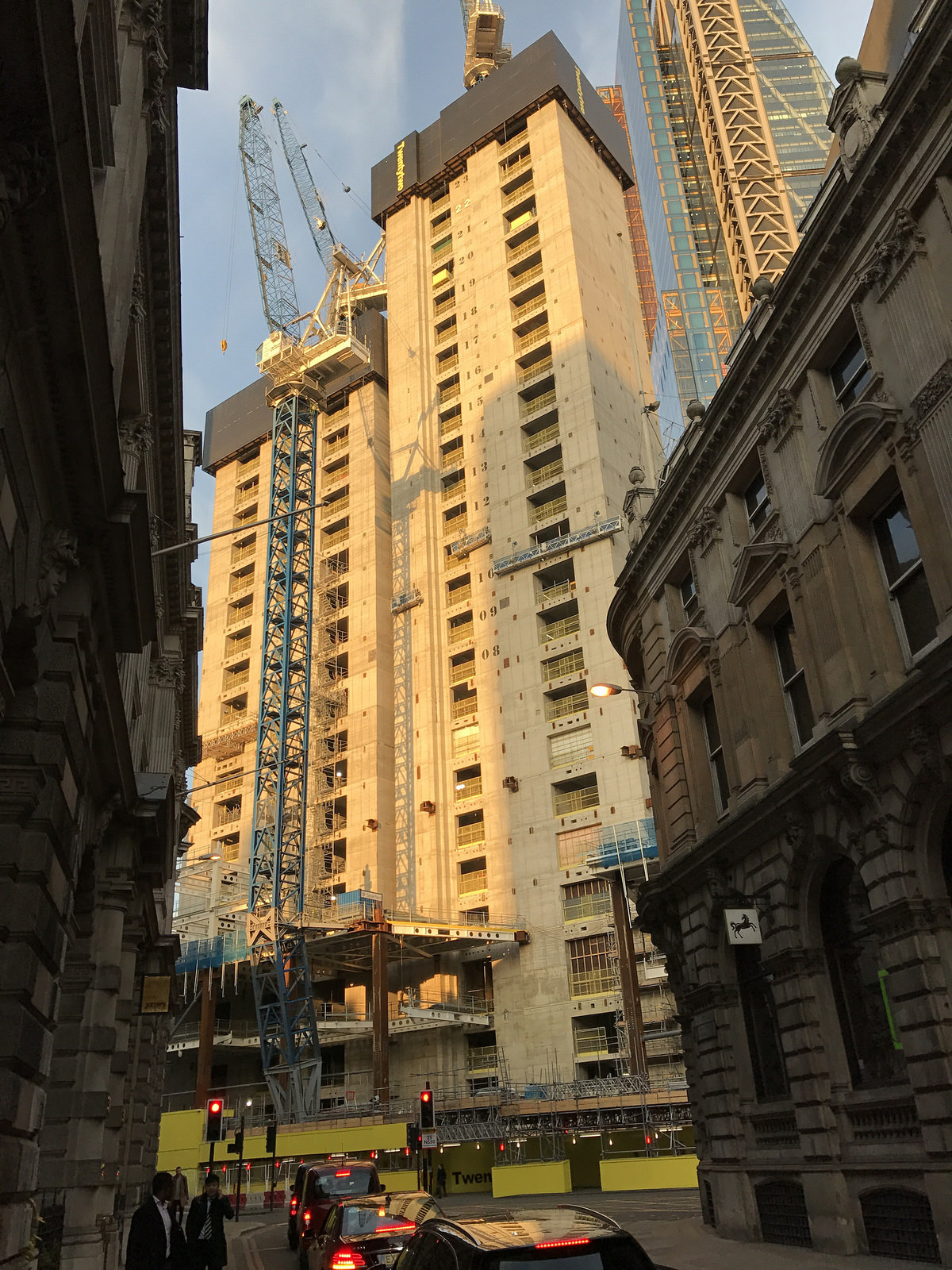
22 Bishopsgate site, May 2017

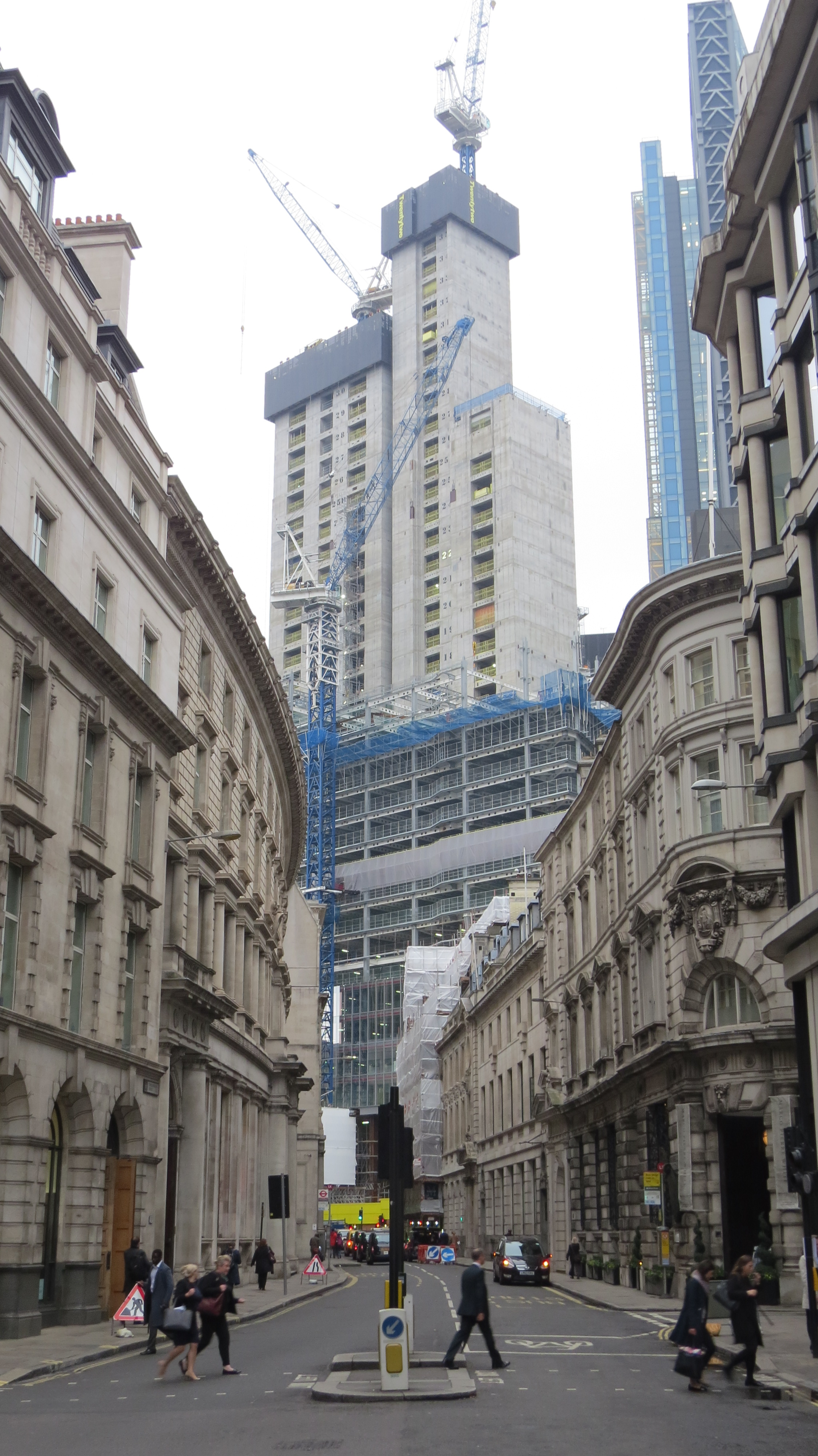
22 Bishopsgate site, Oct 2017

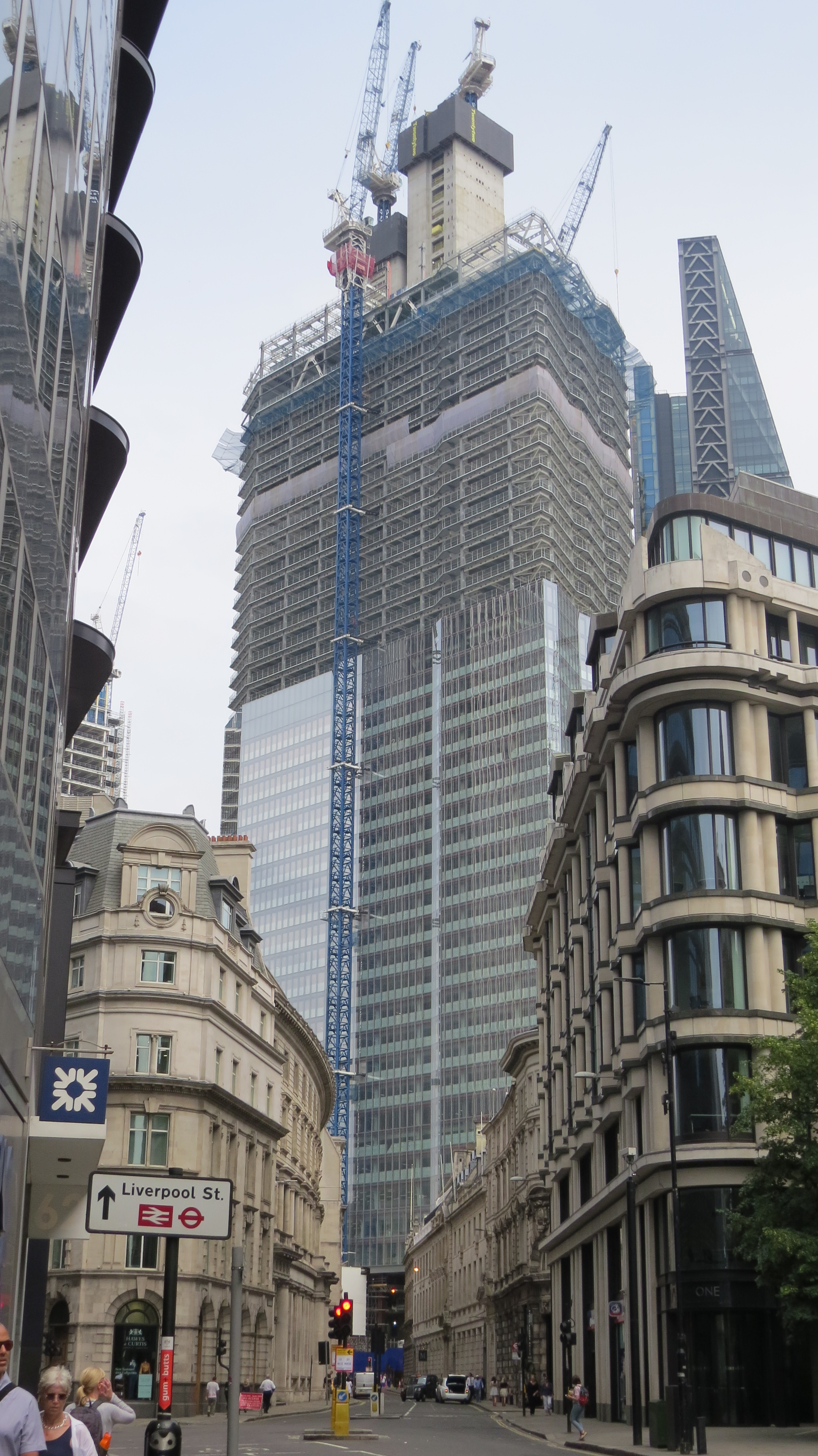
22 Bishopsgate site, Jun 2018

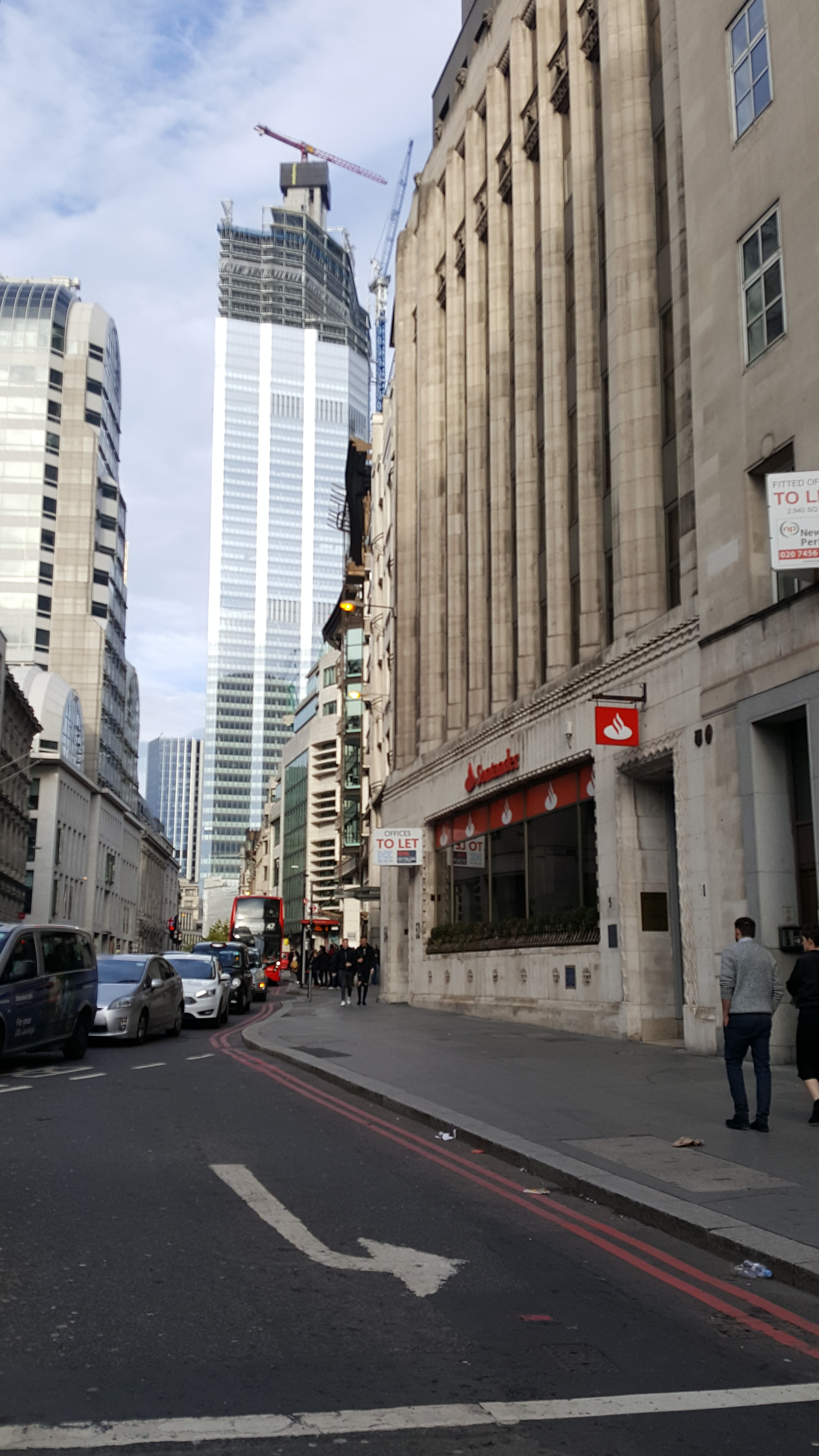
22 Bishopsgate site, Nov 2018

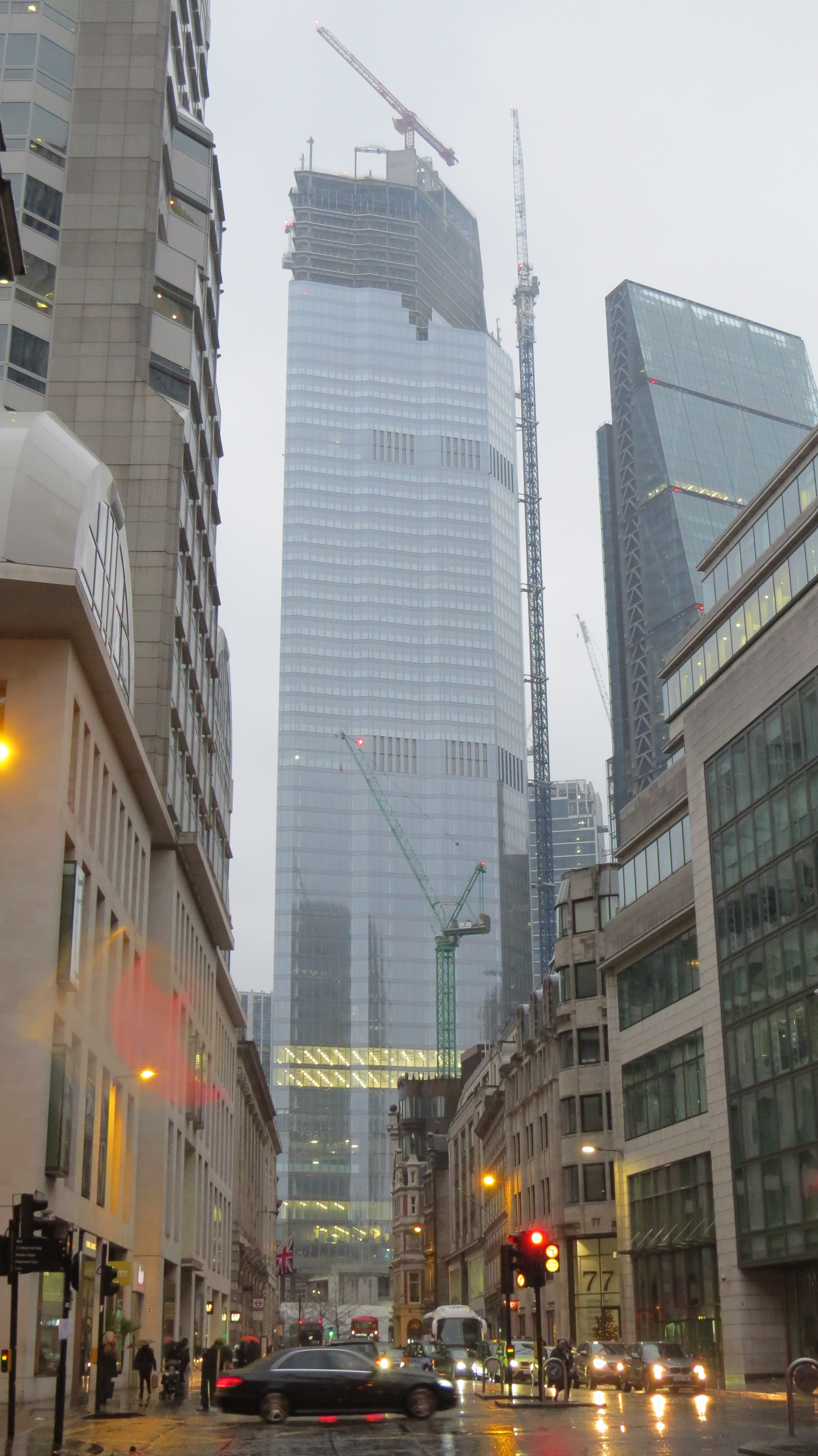
22 Bishopsgate site, Dec 2018

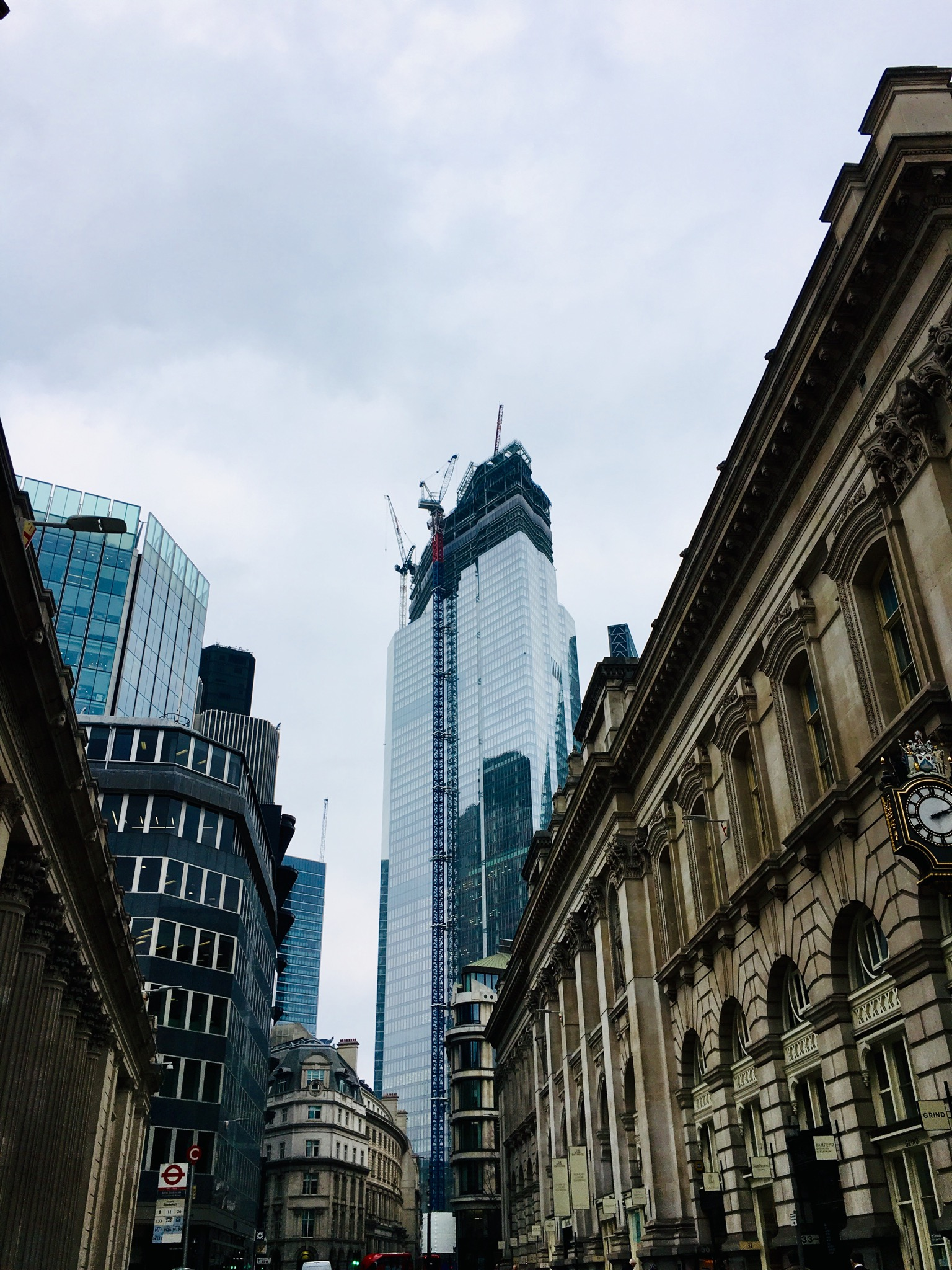
22 Bishopsgate site, Mar 2019

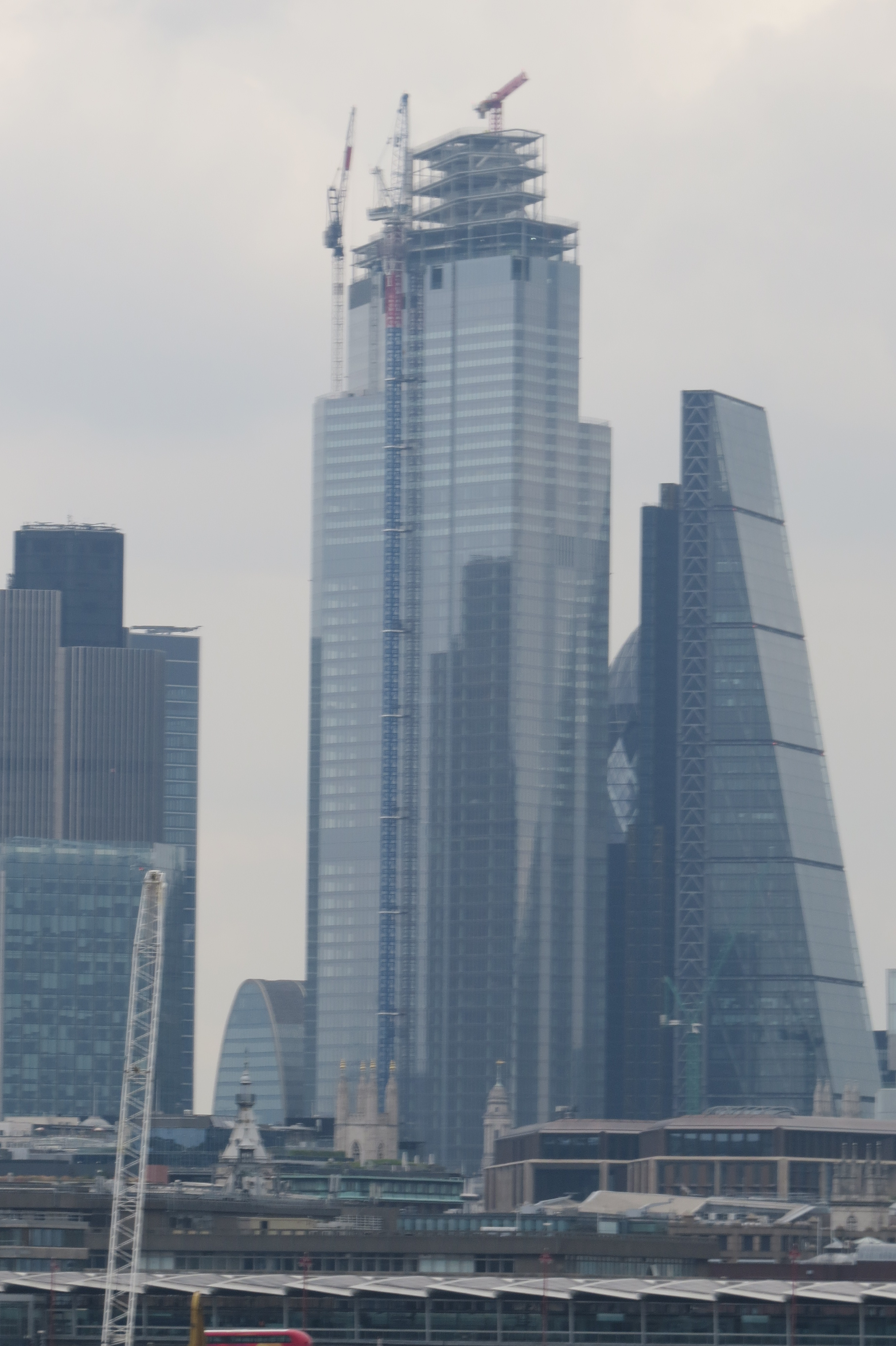
22 Bishopsgate, May 2019

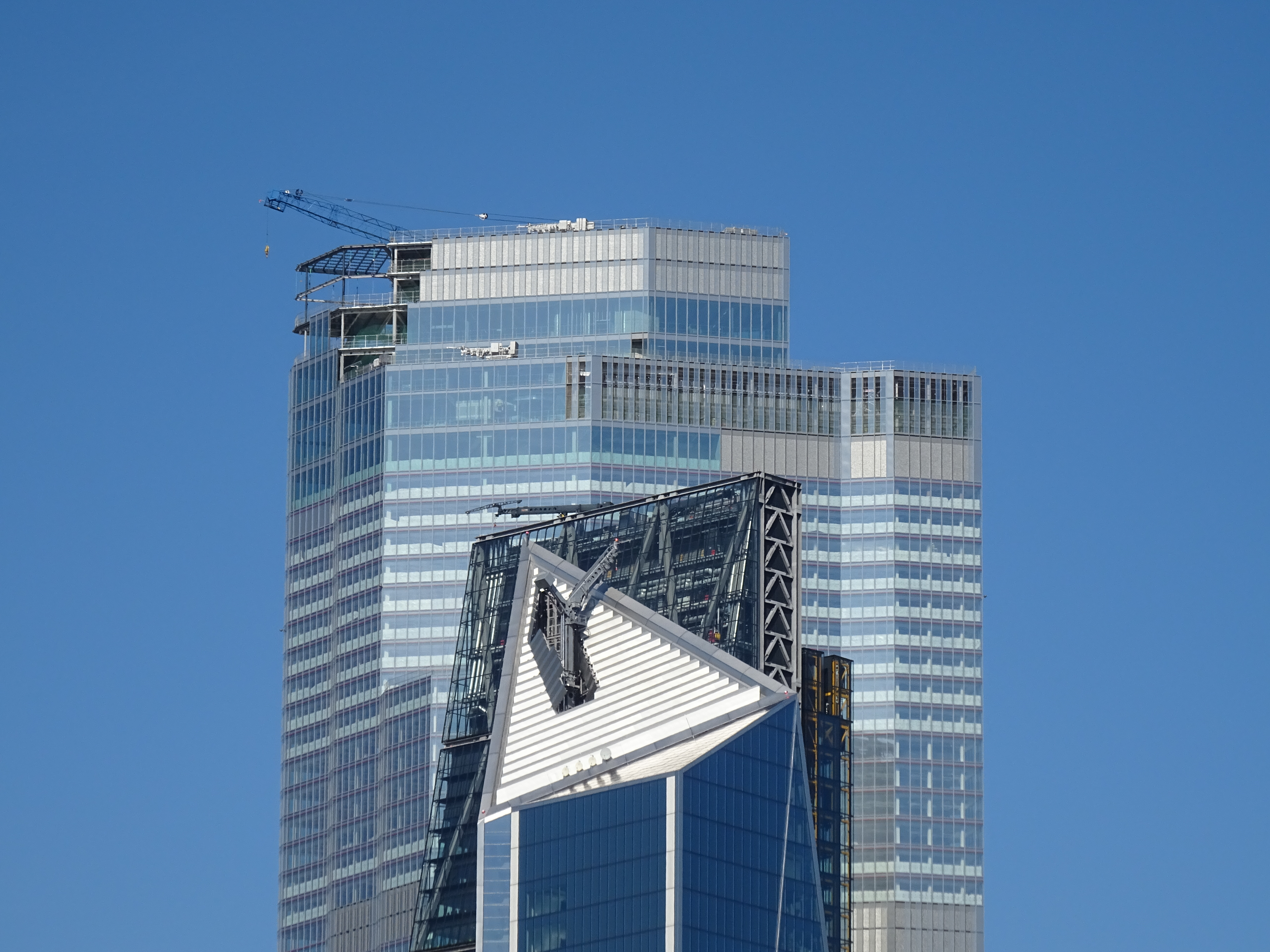
22 Bishopsgate, September 2019 (close to completion)

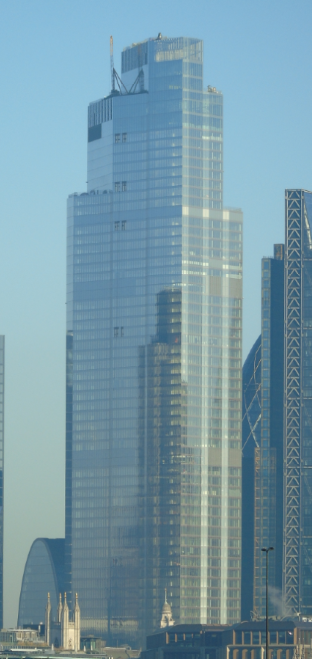
22 Bishopsgate, December 2019

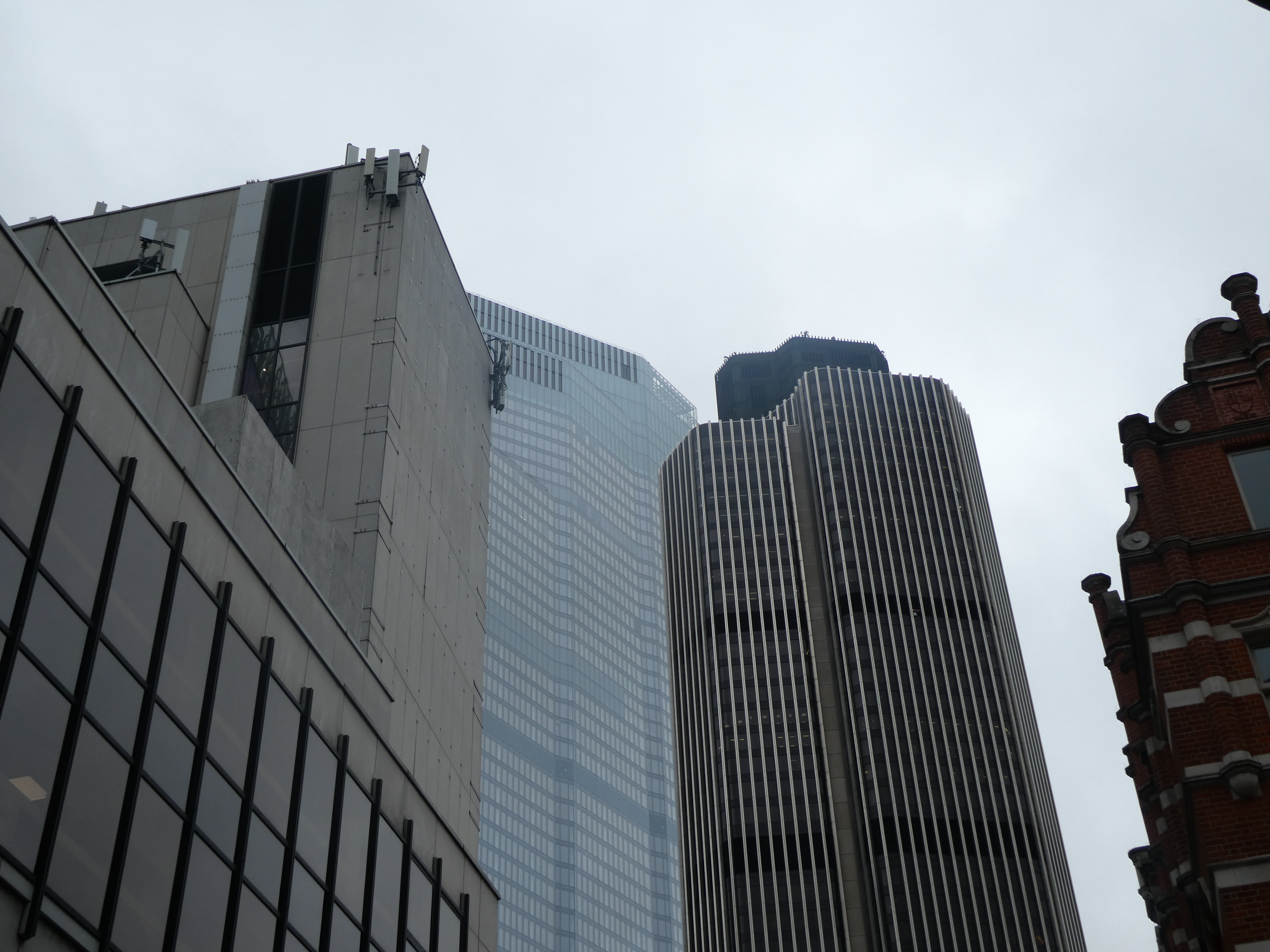
22 Bishopsgate amongst other buildings, Feb 2020

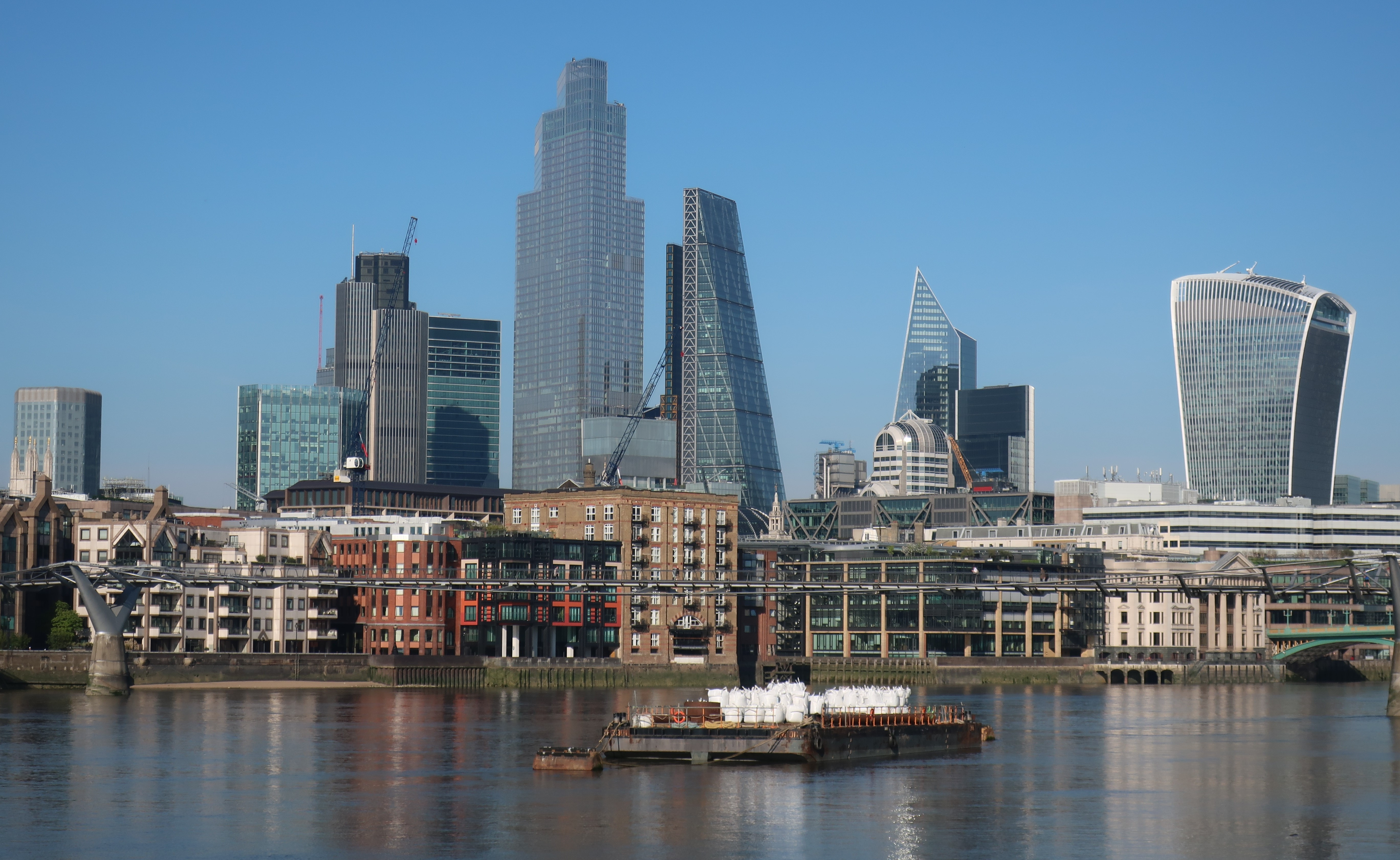
City of London skyline viewed from Bankside, with 22 Bishopsgate prominent, April 2020

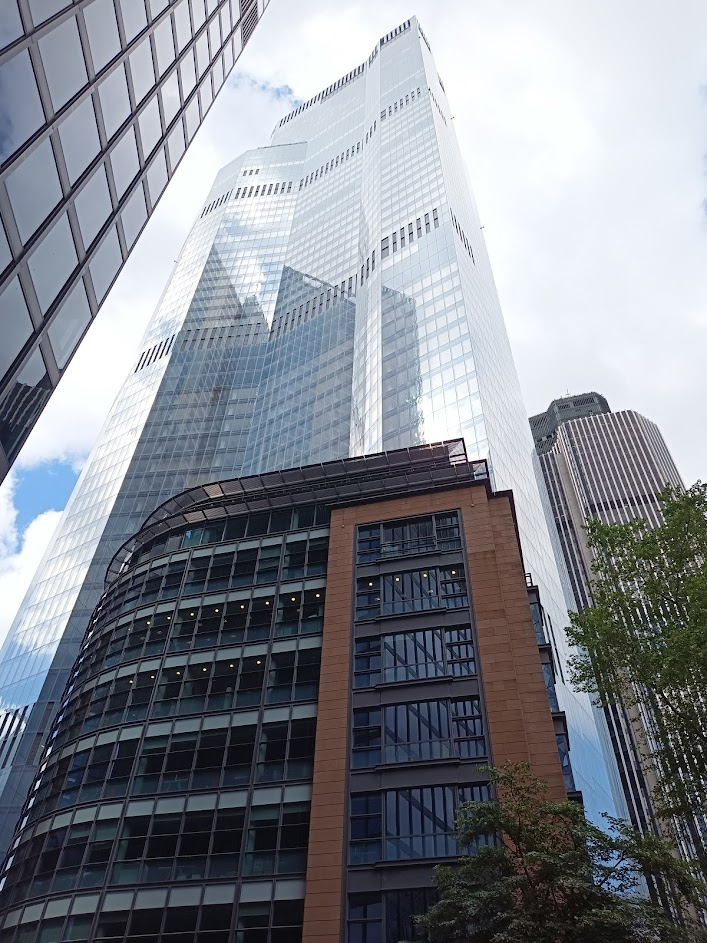
22 Bishopsgate viewed from Undershaft, August 2020

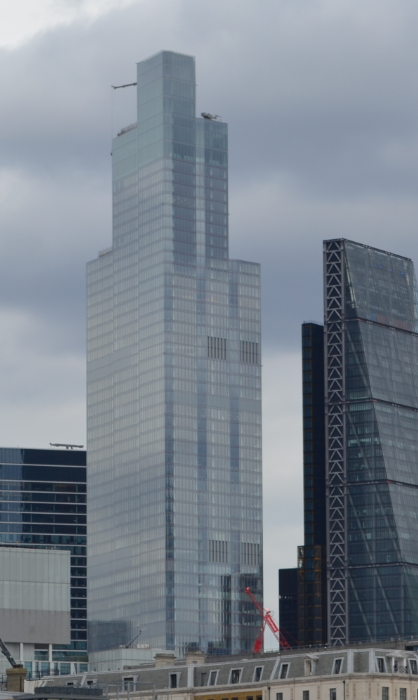
22 Bishopsgate, September 2020

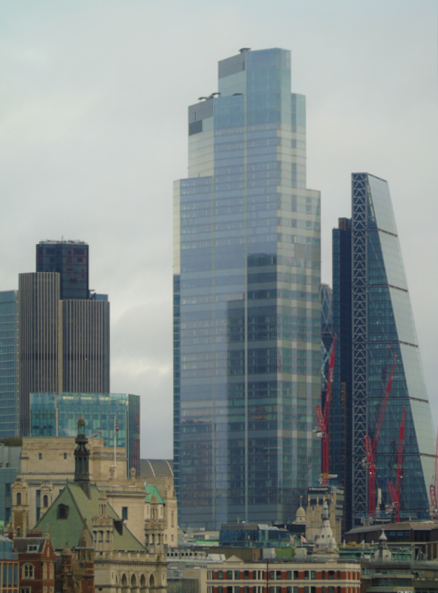
22 Bishopsgate, December 2020

== See also ==
- City of London landmarks
- Solar power in the United Kingdom
