= Building Design =

United Kingdom-based magazine

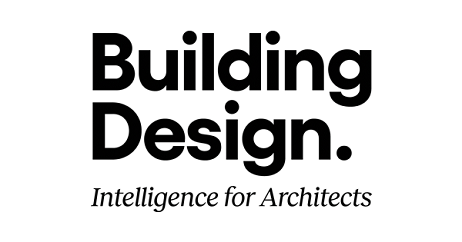
- Editor: Chloe McCulloch (Editorial Director); Ben Flatman (Architectural Editor)
- Categories: Architecture
- Frequency: Weekly
- Circulation: 7,698 (2013) ▼
- Founded: 1969
- Final issue: March 2014 (print)
- Company: United Business Media
- Country: United Kingdom
- Based in: London
- Language: English
- Website: bdonline.co.uk
- ISSN: 0007-3423

Building Design, or BD, is a leading online platform for architectural news, analysis, and commentary, based in London.

BD was launched in 1969 by publisher Morgan Grampian as a closed circulation weekly at a time when high-tech architecture was just starting to take off. It ceased its print edition in March 2014, becoming a digital-only publication.

Unlike some other architectural publications, BD's editors and staff are mainly journalists rather than architects. The magazine is free to subscribers and offers limited free access to non-subscribers. It is funded by revenue from advertising.

== Circulation ==
By 2025, Building Design had over 141,500 registered users and more than 17,100 paid users. Its website, bdonline.co.uk, attracted 79,000 unique users and over 210,000 page impressions per month. The publication also had a social media reach of 198,000 across Facebook, Twitter, and LinkedIn.

The publishing company is Assemble Media Group, which also publishes Building and Housing Today.

== AYA and YAYA ==
BD hosts the Architect of the Year Awards and Young Architect of the Year in central London, attended annually by over 500 senior decision makers.

The Architect of the Year Awards reward the UK's top architectural practices behind excellent built projects. Since their launch in 2004, the awards have grown in size and stature, featuring entries and attendance from leading practices, and have become firmly established as a key event in the architectural calendar. The awards night is now one of the largest gatherings of architects in the UK.

The Young Architect of the Year Award recognises and rewards Europe's most promising new architects and practices. Previous winners have included Coffey Architects, Jonathan Hendry, Serie Architects, David Kohn Architects, Hackett Hall McKnight, Carmody Groarke, Nord and Lynch Architects.

== World Architecture 100 ==
BD publishes an annual ranking of the world's biggest architecture practices known as the World Architecture 100. The listing is distributed to the top FTSE 100 companies as well as BD subscribers and is available to buy online.

== Print edition ==
Building Design cover from 2013

Building Design ceased its print edition in 2014 and became a digital-only publication.

In 2006, the last year of the independent ABC circulation reports, the magazine had a circulation of over 23,000, with 21,500 circulated free to professional and industry-related subscriptions.

The magazine stopped free access to news, blogs and video content on its website in September 2010 when it introduced a subscription for full access.

== Carbuncle Cup ==
The Carbuncle Cup was BD's annual prize for the worst new architecture in the UK. It ran from 2006-2018, and was launched as a humorous counterpart to the Stirling Prize.

A shortlist was announced each summer, based on nominations from the public. The winner was selected by a small group of architecture critics and professionals.

=== Recent winners ===
As of 2018, the winners were:

- 2018 – Redrock Stockport, Stockport, Greater Manchester, by BDP
- 2017 – Nova Victoria, City of Westminster, London, by PLP Architecture
- 2016 – Lincoln Plaza, Isle of Dogs, London, by Hamiltons Architects
- 2015 – 20 Fenchurch Street (the 'Walkie Talkie'), City of London, by Rafael Viñoly
- 2014 – Woolwich Central, London, by Sheppard Robson
- 2013 – 465 Caledonian Road, London, by Stephen George and Partners
- 2012 – Cutty Sark Renovation, Greenwich, London, by Grimshaw Architects
- 2011 – MediaCityUK, Salford, by Fairhurst, Chapman Taylor and Wilkinson Eyre
- 2010 – Strata, Elephant and Castle, London, by BFLS
- 2009 – Liverpool Ferry Terminal, Liverpool, by Hamilton Architects
- 2008 – Radisson SAS Waterfront Hotel, Saint Helier, Jersey, by EPR Architects
- 2007 – Opal Court, Leicester, by Stephen George and Partners
- 2006 – Drake Circus Shopping Centre, Plymouth, by Chapman Taylor

== Staff ==
The editorial director is Chloe McCulloch and the architectural editor is Ben Flatman.

Past editors and staff include Amanda Baillieu, Paul Finch, Peter Murray, Martin Pawley, Hugh Pearman, Marcus Fairs, Oliver Wainwright, Owen Hatherley and Kieran Long.

== Campaigns ==
Building Design campaigned with the Twentieth Century Society for Robin Hood Gardens, a housing estate in Poplar, London, designed by Alison and Peter Smithson, to be listed and retained. It has likewise argued against the unnecessary demolition of old school buildings.
