= Lincoln Plaza (London) =

Housing development on the Isle of Dogs in London, England

Coordinates: 51.4984°N 0.0193°W

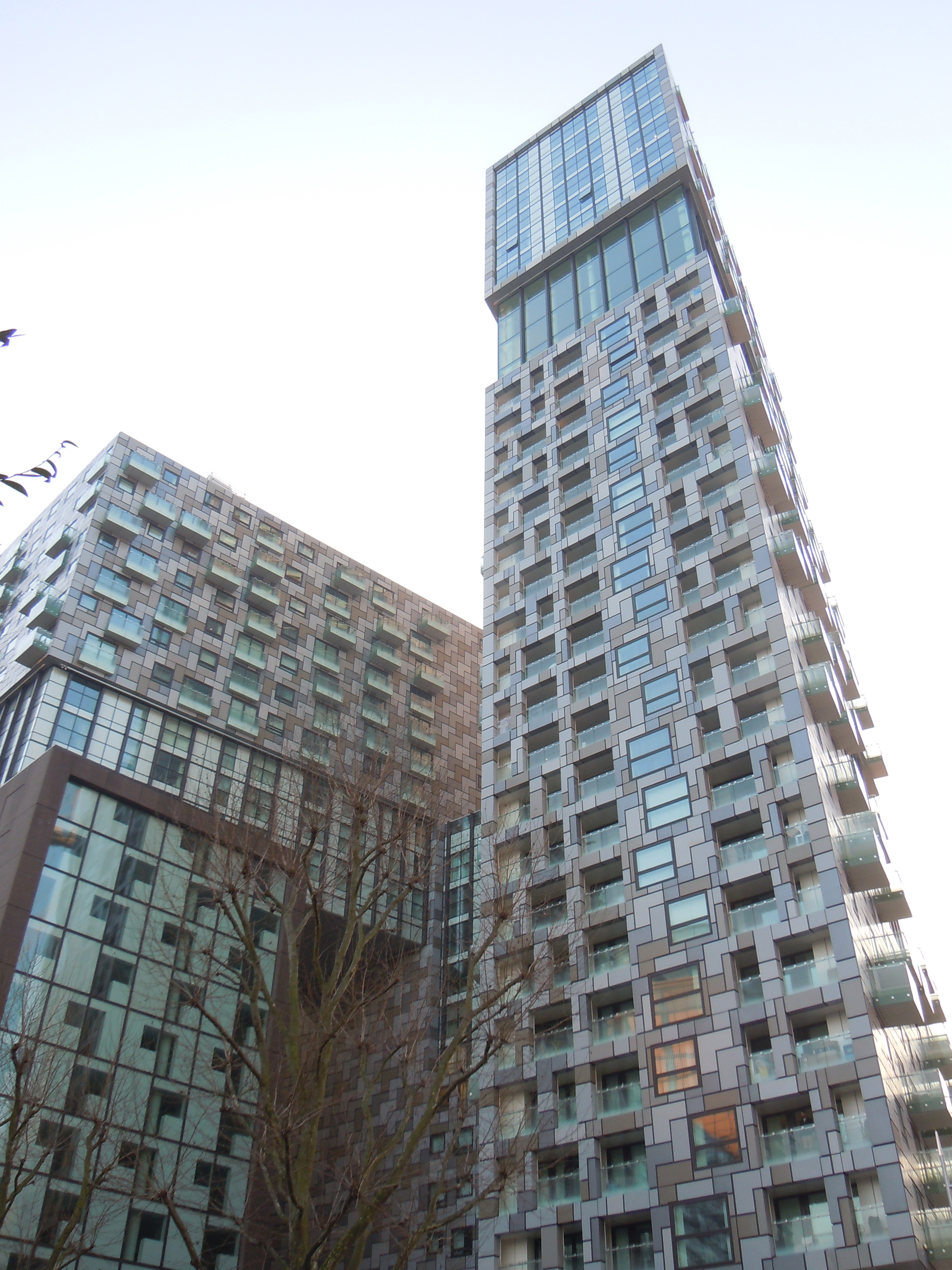
Lincoln Plaza in January 2017

Lincoln Plaza is a 31-storey luxury housing development situated on Millharbour on the Isle of Dogs, part of the Docklands area of London, England and located near South Quay DLR station. Lincoln Plaza is one of several new high-rise residential developments that have been constructed on the Isle of Dogs in recent years. Designed by BUJ Architects for Galliard Homes, it features two residential towers, and also includes a hotel. The hotel opened in 2018 and will operate under the Curio brand by Hilton.

== Design ==
In 2016, it was named by Building Design magazine as that year's "worst new building" in its annual Carbuncle Cup competition. The developers stated that "These awards are really subjective matters of taste...Architectural design is art, and like all art, a matter of personal tastes. The scheme sold out to buyers, so clearly the project is liked by the purchasers."
