= Beckley Point =

Building in Plymouth, England

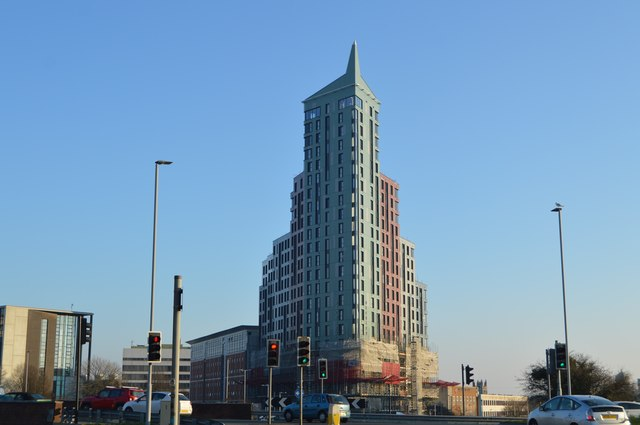
- Interactive map of the Beckley Point area

General information
- Location: Plymouth, Devon, England, 39 Cobourg St, Plymouth, PL1 1SP
- Current tenants: 505
- Construction started: 2015
- Completed: 2018
- Cost: £30.79 million
- Owner: Yugo

Height
- Height: 78 m (256 ft)

Technical details
- Floor count: 23

Design and construction
- Architect: Boyes Rees Architects
- Developer: Threesixty Developments Ltd
- Main contractor: Kier Group

Beckley Point is a private student accommodation building in Plymouth, Devon, England. It is owned and operated by Yugo, previously known as the Student Housing Company.

== Background ==
Standing at 78 metres (256 ft) tall, Beckley Point is the tallest building in the south-west of England outside of Bristol.

The building officially opened in 2018 with 505 student rooms, a number of shared spaces, and a café.

There is a gaming room with eight seats, a study room, a cinema room, a common room and on the 23rd floor of the building there is a sky lounge that is not accessible to members of the public.

== History ==
=== Construction ===
Planning permission for the building was approved on 26 November 2014.

Construction began on 15 August 2015 and was initially completed on 8 February 2017 following delays due to the weather. The building was designed by Boyes Rees Architects, developed by Threesixty Developments, and built by Kier Group.

Following the Grenfell Tower fire in 2017, the building's external cladding was tested and deemed satisfactory, however the developers decided to replace it as a precaution in the same year and completed all construction works in January 2018.

== Incidents ==
During construction works in 2017, a group of teenagers broke into the site and climbed around 250 ft (76 m) up the scaffolding around the building.

On 31 March 2020, the building was evacuated following a leak on the 21st floor which spread to the lower parts of the tower. A similar issue also occurred in 2017 whilst the building was still under construction.

== Reception ==
The building was shortlisted for the Carbuncle Cup in 2018, a prize given to the ugliest building in the UK completed in the previous 12 months.
