= Stephen Conway (property developer) =

- Born: Stephen Stuart Solomon Conway; February 1948 (age 78); Bow, London
- Occupation: property developer
- Title: founder, chairman and CEO of Galliard Homes
- Spouse: Hilary Conway
- Children: 3
- Website: www.galliardhomes.com

Stephen Stuart Solomon Conway (born February 1948) is a British property developer. He is the founder, non-executive chairman and former CEO of Galliard Homes, London's largest privately owned residential property developer.

== Early life ==
Conway was born and grew up in Bow, London.

== Career ==
Conway trained as a banker, before shifting to property in the 1980s and starting a company that was later acquired by Frogmore, for whom he then worked until he and John Black founded Galliard Homes in 1992.

In 2015, he had an estimated net worth of £270 million.

He stepped down as CEO in 2017, but resumed the role between December 2021 and 31 March 2025. He is currently non-executive chairman of the company.

== Personal life ==
He lives with his wife Hilary Conway in Marylebone, London.

He has three sons, and David Conway (born 1976) is a director of Galliard Homes.
