= PLP Architecture =

Architecture firm in London

Practice information
- Founded: 2009
- Location: London

Significant works and honors
- Projects: The Edge, 22 Bishopsgate, Francis Crick Institute, Nova Victoria

Website
- www.plparchitecture.com

PLP Architecture is a commercial architecture firm based in London. In June 2016, the firm received planning permission for 22 Bishopsgate, the tallest tower in the City of London.

== History ==
The firm was founded by Lee Polisano, former President of the American firm Kohn Pedersen Fox (KPF), David Leventhal, former KPF Senior Partner, and Fred Pilbrow, Karen Cook and Ron Bakker, all former KPF Partners, following their departure from the firm's London office in 2009. Pilbrow soon left the start-up to start his own firm.

== Projects ==
=== The Edge ===
In 2015, PLP completed the world's most sustainable office building according to the Building Research Establishment (BRE), The Edge, in Amsterdam.

=== 22 Bishopsgate ===
In June 2016, PLP received planning permission for 22 Bishopsgate, which will be the tallest tower in the City of London, a 62-storey multiple tenancy office tower developed by a consortium led by Axa Real Estate. The building is expected to provide workspaces for nearly 12,000 people, and to be the first building in London to be WELL Certified, a building rating system focused on human health and wellness.

=== Collective Old Oak ===
In May 2016, PLP completed Collective Old Oak, the world's largest co-living building. In addition to 546 co-living rooms, the project includes co-working, community and retail spaces on the lower floors, as well as two terraces and amenity spaces.

=== Sky Headquarters ===
Opened in December 2016, the headquarters for Sky UK accommodates over 3500 employees in a large, sky-lit warehouse-like space, covered by the largest timber roof in the UK.

=== Other projects ===
In 2016 the practice completed the new biomedical research facility for the Medical Research Council, The Francis Crick Institute north of the British Library, together with HOK.

Their commercial development at Nova Victoria in London's City of Westminster (for which they also prepared the masterplan) won the 2017 Carbuncle Cup for the ugliest building in the United Kingdom.

They collaborated with Cambridge University and Smith and Wallwork Engineers on a study into wooden skyscrapers.

== Awards ==
London's Nova Victoria mixed-use development by PLP Architecture won the 2017 Carbuncle Cup, described by award panelist Catherine Croft as a 'crass assault on the senses'.
