= Nova Victoria =

Mixed-use development in London

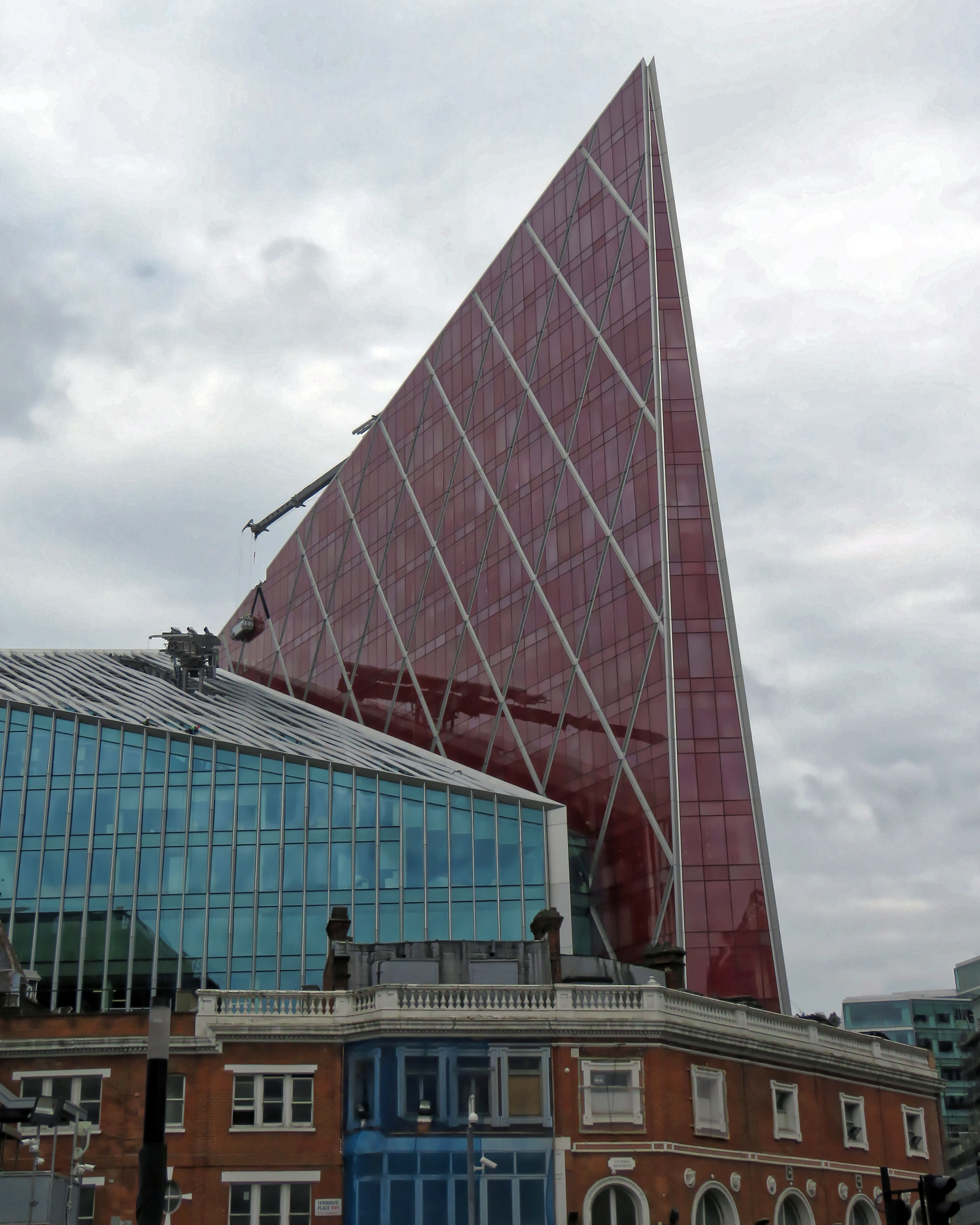
- Interactive map of the Nova Victoria area

General information
- Type: Mixed-use
- Location: Victoria, London, England
- Coordinates: 51.4973°N 0.1436°W
- Construction started: 2013
- Completed: 2017

Height
- Roof: 86.7 m (284 ft)

Technical details
- Floor count: 19
- Floor area: 897,000 sq ft (83,300 m^{2})

Design and construction
- Architecture firm: PLP Architecture

Nova Victoria, often simply Nova, is a mixed-use development in Victoria, an area of Westminster, London. It consists of three blocks making up a total of 897,000 square feet (83,300 m^{2}) of floorspace. This is spread across office and residential accommodation, as well as housing the Nova Place food court.

In 2017 it won Building Design's Carbuncle Cup, giving it the distinction of the "UK's ugliest building" for that year, and was described by judges as a "crass assault on the senses". It replaced a number of older buildings, including a Grade II listed pawnbroker, the facade of which was relocated.

Plans were made in 2016 for an eastern section that would wrap around the Victoria Palace Theatre, but these were indefinitely put on hold.
