= Bruce Martin (architect) =

Bruce Martin FRIBA
- Born: 20 December 1917; Clapham, London, England
- Died: 22 April 2015 (aged 97)
- Education: University of Hong Kong; University of Cambridge (MA); Architectural Association School of Architecture (AADipl)
- Occupations: Architect; Designer
- Employers: Hertfordshire County Council; British Standards Institution; Cambridge School of Architecture
- Known for: K8 telephone box
- Spouse: Barbara Parr (m. 1949; died 2001)
- Children: 2

Bruce Martin FRIBA (20 December 1917 – 22 April 2015) was a British architect who designed the K8 telephone box.

== Biography ==
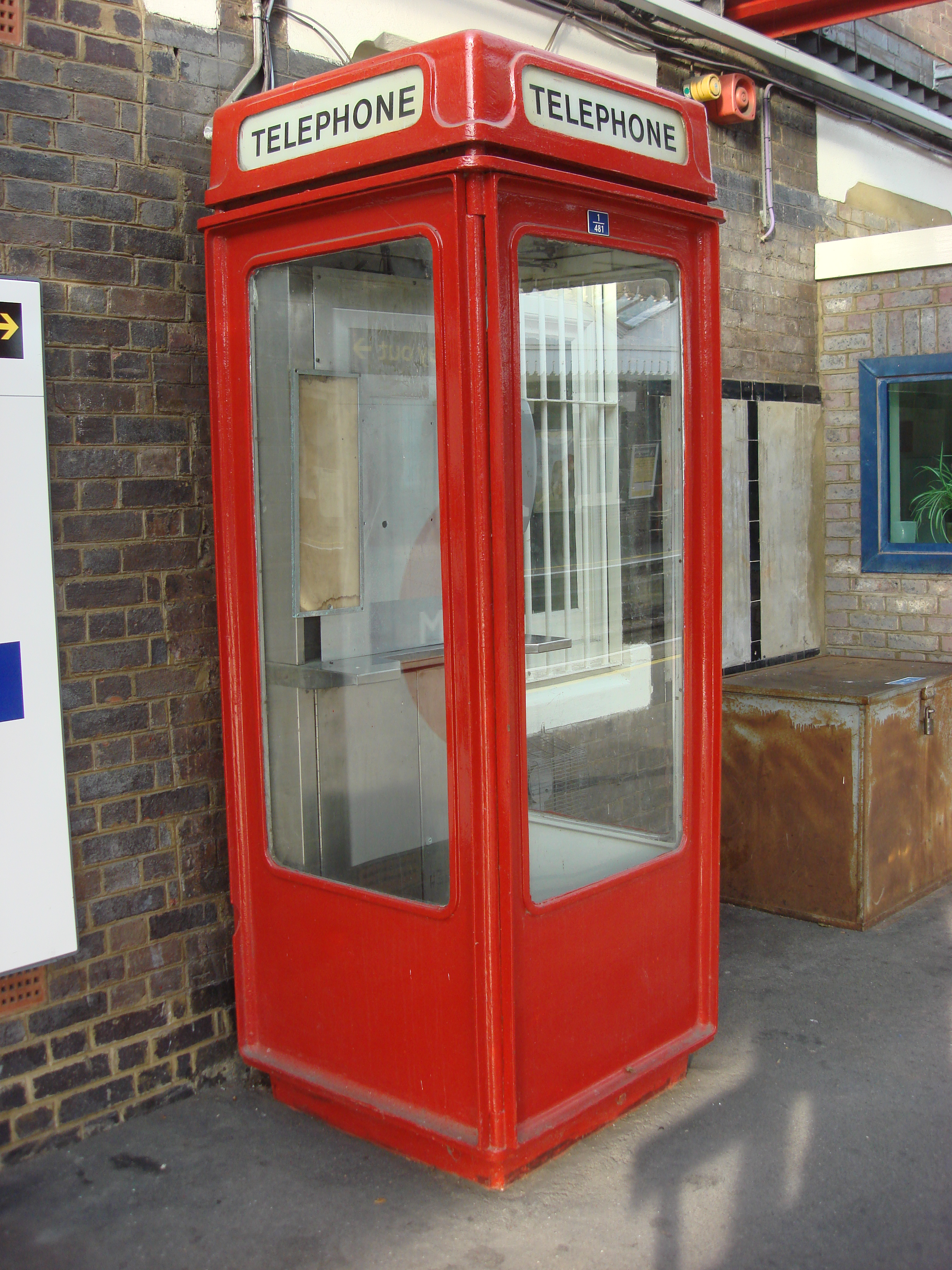
A K8 telephone box in Amersham station

Martin was born 20 December 1917 in Clapham, south London and was raised in Portsmouth. He studied engineering at the University of Hong Kong, then studied at the University of Cambridge, followed by the Architectural Association School of Architecture (the AA). After graduating from the AA he worked for the Hertfordshire County Council designing schools as part of "the Hertfordshire experiment", which was a large scale building programme designed to produce more schools for the county. He was job architect for the grade II* listed Morgan's Junior School in Hertford.

In 1953 he moved to the British Standards Institution, then in the 1960s he began teaching part time at the Cambridge School of Architecture alongside running his own architectural practice. He designed the K8 telephone box, launched in 1968.

== Personal life ==
In 1943 Martin married fellow architect Barbara Parr.

== Collections ==
The Institute of Education at University College London holds a small archive of material relating to Martin's career. The collection includes notes, printed papers, and reports about the building of schools in Cheshunt and Hertfordshire, and a copy of Martin's 1953 book School Buildings 1945-1951. The collection was given to the National Primary Education Archive at Bishop Grosseteste College by Martin in 1995 and transferred to the Institute of Education in 1998.

== Publications ==
- Martin, Bruce (1952). School Buildings, 1945-1951. C. Lockwood.
- —————— (1977). Joints in Buildings. London: George Godwin Limited. ISBN 978-0-470-99106-0.
