= Poole Methodist Church =

Church in Poole, England

Coordinates: 50°43′00″N 1°59′00″W

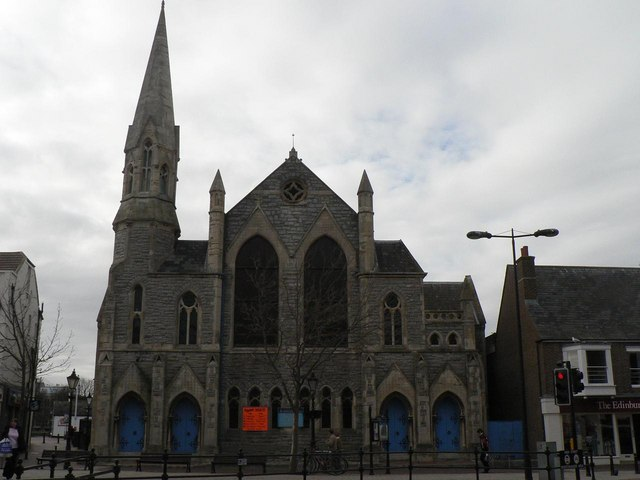
Poole Methodist Church in 2008, prior to the building extension being built.

Poole Methodist Church (also known as Poole High Street Methodist Church or The Spire) is a nineteenth-century Methodist church on Poole High Street in Dorset, England. An extension to the church was nominated for the 2016 Carbuncle Cup for "the ugliest building in the United Kingdom completed in the last 12 months".

== History ==
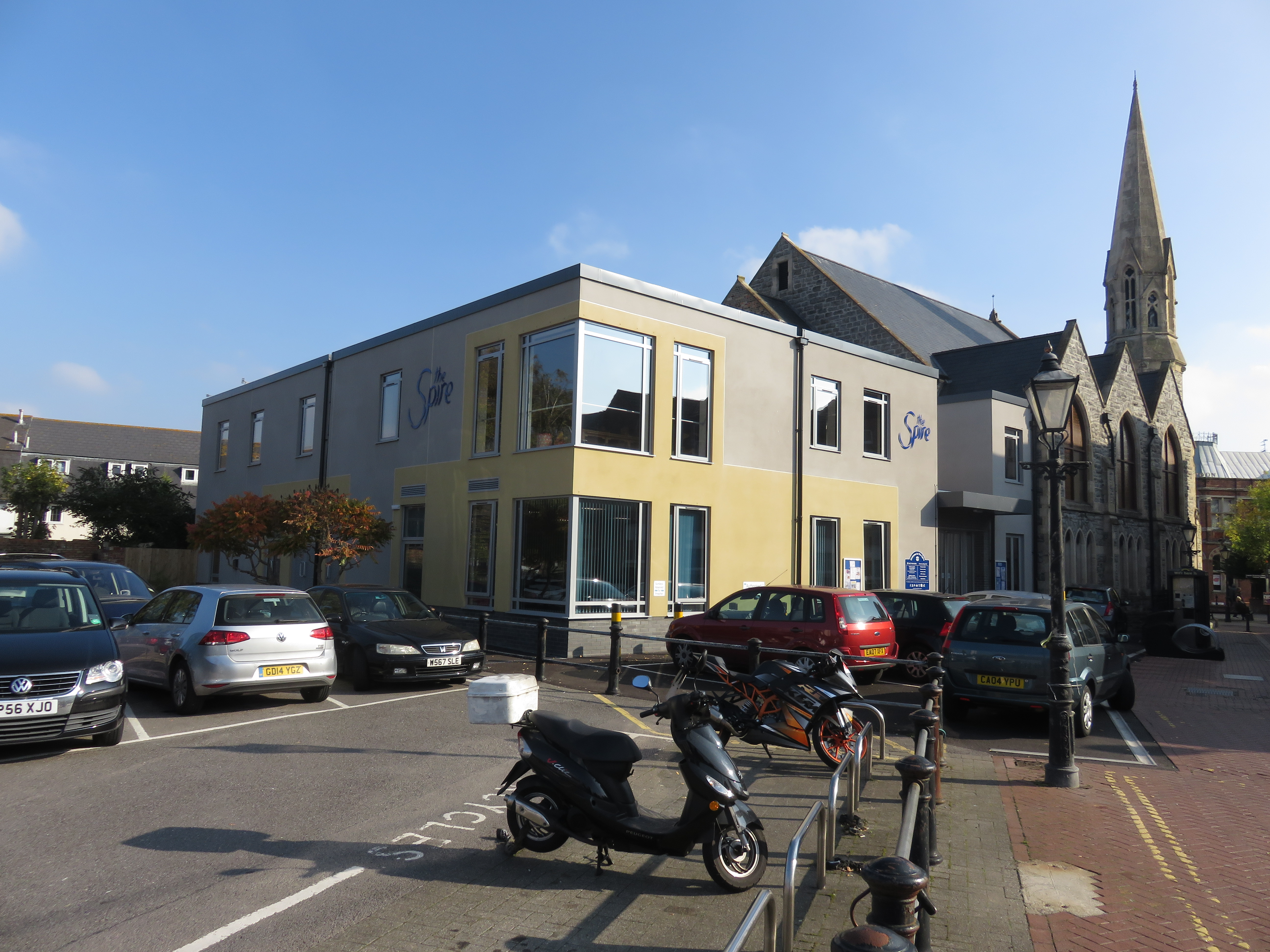
The church from the rear, showing the extension.

A methodist chapel existed in Poole from 1793, but was shut down when the Poole Methodist Church was built. Poole Methodist Church was built by Charles Bell between 1878 and 1880 out of Purbeck and Bath stone, and was opened to the public in 1880. It is a gothic building, with a distinguishable large pointed north-west tower, and a chapel building that was built in 1893. Between 1843 and 1985, the church was part of the Poole Methodist Circuit, a collection of methodist churches in the Poole and East Dorset area. During the Second World War, the building was used as a schoolroom.

In 2005, five methodist churches in Poole combined into one congregation based at the Poole Methodist Church. In 2011, the church was used as a polling station for the United Kingdom Alternative Vote referendum.

=== Renovation ===
In the summer of 2009, the church was closed for safety reasons after plaster from the building's walls started to fall off. An application was made that year to renovate and extend the building, to make it the centre of Poole's methodist community. The project was estimated to cost £4 million, and was accepted in 2010. Phase one of the project was completed in 2014, with the introduction of a new café; the project received around £200,000 from the Garfield Weston Foundation. The church's windows were later replaced by double glazed windows. The new extension was completed in 2016, with the church rebranding itself as "The Spire". The extension replaced a previous Georgian chapel. In 2016, the extension was nominated for the Carbuncle Cup, an annual award given to "the ugliest building in the United Kingdom completed in the last 12 months". The Guardian described the extension as "a pile of site Portakabins they forgot to remove."
