= Carbuncle Cup =

Annual architecture prize given to the ugliest building in the United Kingdom

- Awarded for: Annual architecture prize given to the ugliest building in the United Kingdom
- Sponsored by: Building Design (2006–2018); The Fence (2024–present)
- First award: 2006; 20 years ago (first run), 2024; 2 years ago (second run)
- Final award: 2018; 8 years ago (first run), to present (second run)

The Carbuncle Cup is an architecture prize, awarded annually—originally by the magazine Building Design from 2006 to 2018 and, since 2024, by The Fence—to "the very worst new building in Britain" completed in the preceding year. It was conceived as a humorous counterpart to the prestigious Stirling Prize, presented by the Royal Institute of British Architects.

== History ==
=== First run (2006–2018) ===
The award was inspired by the Carbuncle Awards, which the Scottish architecture magazine Prospect (now Urban Realm) had been presenting to buildings and areas in Scotland since 2000.

Its name derives from a 1984 comment by Charles, Prince of Wales (now Charles III), an opponent of certain modernist styles and a defender of established architectural character, who described Ahrends, Burton and Koralek's proposed extension to London's National Gallery as a "monstrous carbuncle on the face of a much-loved and elegant friend".

The Carbuncle Cup was launched in 2006, with the first winner being the Drake Circus Shopping Centre in Plymouth, designed by Chapman Taylor. Each year the magazine announced a shortlist based on public nominations, usually in the same week as the Stirling Prize shortlist. The winner was initially chosen by free online voting, but from 2009 onwards a small panel of critics selected the recipient. The original run concluded in 2018.

=== Second run (2024–present) ===
In 2024 the Soho-based magazine The Fence revived the award, with the first year recognising buildings completed since the final award of the original run in 2018. The jury for the 2024 awards comprised:

- Tim Abrahams (chair) – contributing editor, Architectural Record
- Vicky Richardson – FRIBA, architectural curator
- Cajsa Carlson – deputy editor, Dezeen
- James McLachlan – former editor, Icon
- Lucy Watson – commissioning editor, Financial Times
- Penny Lewis – lecturer, University of Dundee; co-founder of the Carbuncle Awards
- Charlie Baker – editor, The Fence

The jury for the 2026 awards comprised:

- Catherine Slessor (chair) – critic
- Phineas Harper – critic and sculptor
- Lucy Watson – commissioning editor, Financial Times
- Lev Bratiskenko
- William Pelham – co-founder, The Fence
- Bertie Brandes – screenwriter of The Moment

== Winners and nominees ==
=== First run (2006–2018) ===
Winners and nominees of the first run (2006–2018)
Year	Architect	Winning work		Nominees and works
2006	Chapman Taylor	Shopping centre façade with diagonal cladding panels	Drake Circus Shopping Centre, Plymouth	Page & Park for BBC Radio Merseyside, Liverpool; FaulknerBrowns Architects for Ibis Hotel, Harbourside, Bristol; CZWG for Lough Road Housing, Holloway, London; Foster + Partners for Moor House, City of London; S&P Architects for Nexus One, Swiss Cottage, London; Rem Koolhaas for Serpentine Pavilion, Hyde Park, London; Broadway Malyan for St George Wharf, Lambeth, London; John McAslan/Dandara for St George's Island, Castlefield, Manchester; Llewlyn Davies for University College Hospital, Bloomsbury, London
2007	Stephen George & Partners	Aerial photograph of a modern university building	Opal Court, Leicester	Peter Redhead Architects for Holiday Inn, Westhill, Aberdeenshire; Allford Hall Monaghan Morris for KX200, Pentonville Road, London; Foster & Partners for More London, South Bank, London; BBLB Architects with John Rocha for Orion Building, Birmingham; Edward Potter Associates for Skydec apartments, Wandsworth, London; East Riding of Yorkshire Council and Atkins for Treasure House, Beverley, East Riding of Yorkshire
2008	EPR Architects	Hotel façade with a circular glass‑clad tower	Radisson SAS Waterfront hotel, Saint Helier, Jersey	BCA Architects for Aqua housing, Poole, Dorset; Trinity Architecture for B-Central apartments, Bournemouth; Allies and Morrison for Blue Fin building, Bankside, London; Aedas for Bridgewater Place, Leeds; Skidmore, Owings and Merrill for Broadgate Tower, Bishopsgate, London; Bourne Parking for Walton Street car park, Aylesbury, Buckinghamshire
2009	Hamilton Architects	Ferry terminal with an angular Portland stone structure	Liverpool Ferry Terminal, Liverpool	Make Architects for Amenities Building and International House, University of Nottingham Jubilee Campus; Allan Murray Architects for Hotel Missoni, Edinburgh; Pelli Clarke Pelli for One Park West, Liverpool One; Calderpeel Carden Croft for Poundbury Fire Station, Poundbury, Dorset; Dyer Associates for Queen Margaret University, Musselburgh, East Lothian; Austin Smith Lord for Theatre Severn, Shrewsbury; Halliday Fraser Munro for Union Plaza, Aberdeen; Westfield Group for Westfield Shopping Centre, Shepherd's Bush, London; Coogan & Co. for Woodlands Manor, Belfast
2010	BFLS	Skyscraper with three integrated wind turbines	Strata SE1, Elephant & Castle, London	T. P. Bennett for Bézier Apartments, Old Street, London; East Ayrshire Council for Burns Monument Centre, Kilmarnock, East Ayrshire; Reid Jubb Brown for Haymarket Hub, Newcastle; WDR & RT Taggart for St Anne's Square, Belfast; Make Architects for The Cube, Birmingham
2011	Fairhurst, Chapman Taylor and Wilkinson Eyre	High‑density buildings with glazed façades	MediaCityUK, Salford Quays	Molyneux Architects for Ebenezer Chapel and Housing Development, Brighton; 3XN/AEW Architects for Museum of Liverpool, Liverpool; Grimshaw Architects and Atkins for Newport Station, Newport, Wales; Rogers Stirk Harbour + Partners for One Hyde Park, Knightsbridge, London; Bond Bryan for Phoenix High School, Shepherd's Bush, London
2012	Grimshaw Architects	Clipper ship set on top of a glass‑roofed structure	Cutty Sark Renovation, Greenwich, London	Anish Kapoor and Cecil Balmond for ArcelorMittal Orbit, Olympic Park, London; Andrew Smith Architects for Firepool Lock Housing, Taunton, Somerset; Broadway Malyan for Mann Island Buildings, Liverpool; IDP Partnership for Shard End Library, Birmingham; Todd Architects and Civic Arts for Titanic Belfast Museum, Belfast
2013	Stephen George & Partners	Brick façade in front of a modern, grey‑clad building	465 Caledonian Road, University College London	Stock Woolstencroft for Avant Garde, 34–42 Bethnal Green Road, Bethnal Green, London; K2 Architects for Porth Eirias Watersports Centre, Colwyn Bay, Wales; Hamiltons for Premier Inn (formerly General Lying-In Hospital), Lambeth, London; Seven Architecture and Smeeden Foreman for Redcar Beacon ('The Vertical Pier'), Redcar, North Yorkshire
2014	Sheppard Robson	Glass‑clad residential blocks above a large glazed supermarket	Woolwich Central, Woolwich, London	Stride Treglown for Chancellor's Building, University of Bath; CZWG for QN7 flats, Holloway, London; 3DReid for Trinity Square, Gateshead; BDP for Unite Stratford City, Stratford, London; Broadway Malyan for Vauxhall Tower, Vauxhall, London
2015	Rafael Viñoly	Skyscraper with a flared, top‑heavy form	20 Fenchurch Street ('The Walkie-Talkie'), City of London	Fluid Design for City Gateway, Swaythling, Southampton; Keith Williams Architects for Parliament House, Lambeth, London; Robert Kilgour Architects for Waltham Forest YMCA building, Waltham Forest, London; John Simpson Architects for Whittle Building, Peterhouse, University of Cambridge; careyjones chapmantolcher (CJCT) for Woodward Hall, Imperial College London, North Acton, London
2016	Hamiltons Architects	Residential towers with heavily fragmented façades	Lincoln Plaza, Isle of Dogs, London	Make Architects for 5 Broadgate, Broadgate, City of London; RHWL for One Smithfield, Stoke-on-Trent, Staffordshire; Intelligent Design Centre for Poole Methodist Church extension, Poole, Dorset; Rolfe Judd for Saffron Square, Croydon, London; Twelve Architects for The Diamond, University of Sheffield
2017	PLP Architecture	Red‑glazed building with a fractured, geometric form	Nova Victoria, City of Westminster, London	Vivid Architects for 8 Somers Road, Malvern, Worcestershire; SimpsonHaugh and Partners for Circus West, Battersea Power Station, London; Cooley Architects for Greetham Street Student Halls, Portsmouth; ESA Architecture for Park Plaza Westminster Bridge, Lambeth, London; AHR for Preston railway station Butler Street entrance, Preston, Lancashire
2018	BDP	Grey‑clad and glass‑fronted leisure complex	Redrock Stockport, Stockport, Greater Manchester	Pace Jefford Moore Architects for 20 Ambleside Avenue, Streatham, London; Boyes Rees Architects for Beckley Point, Plymouth; Rolfe Judd for Haydn Tower, Vauxhall, London; PRP Architects for Lewisham Gateway, Lewisham, London; Signature Living for Shankly Hotel, Liverpool

=== Second run (2024–present) ===
Winners and nominees of the second run (2024–present)
Year	Architect	Winning work		Nominees and works
2024	Broadway Malyan	Glass and grey‑panelled cinema façade	Lime Street redevelopment, Liverpool, 2018	MATT Architecture for Ilona Rose House, London, 2021; Comer Homes Group for Mast Quay II, Woolwich Dockyard, London, 2022; Carillion for Royal Liverpool University Hospital, Liverpool, 2022; Twenty First Architects for Virgin Hotel, Glasgow, 2023; Jestico + Whiles for W Hotel, Edinburgh, 2023
2026	PHP Architects and PRP Architects (joint winners)		Astley Warehouses, Astley, Greater Manchester, 2026 and The Filigree, Lewisham, London, 2024	Squire and Partners for art'otel London Hoxton, 2024; Pilbrow & Partners for Aspen Tower, Canary Wharf, London, 2024; Allford Hall Monaghan Morris for Belgrove House, Camden, London, 2025; Falconer Chester Hall for Central Quay, Cardiff, Wales, 2026; Willmore Iles Architects for Robeson House, Southwark, London, 2025; Leach Rhodes Walker for Triangle Yard, Leeds, 2026

== See also ==
- List of architecture awards
