= Lynch Architects =

British architectural firm

Lynch Architects, formed in 1998 by Patrick and Claudia Lynch, is a London-based practice. The directors are Patrick Lynch, Claudia Lynch and David Evans. Lynch Architects was awarded the Young Architect of the Year Award from Building Design magazine in 2005, and co-represented Ireland at the 2008 Venice Architecture Biennale. The practice was selected by Sir David Chipperfield to exhibit at the 2012 Biennale.

The practice's early reputation was established through exhibitions and writing as much as its built work. In 2001, Patrick Lynch, who gained degrees at the universities of Liverpool and Cambridge, exhibited small scale built interventions in existing structures in London and other speculative projects at the ‘Encounters Between Here and There’ show at London's Architecture Foundation.

The practice's first internationally recognised project was a 2003 country house, Marsh View, Norfolk. The practice has since developed its design reputation at a range of scales, from major commercial projects, landscape interventions, housing, memorial sculpture, and a bronze door handle for the manufacturer izé.

Lynch Architects’ work has been reviewed by critics and writers including Ken Powell; Ellis Woodman; Kieran Long; Jonathan Bell and Ellie Stathaki, The New Modern House: Redefining Functionalism, Laurence King, London, 2010; and Joachim Fischer and Chris van Uffelen.

== Design influences ==
Lynch Architects' creative inspiration includes the work of architects such as Sigurd Lewerentz, Alvaro Siza, Luigi Moretti, Francesco Borromini, and Michelangelo. Equally important to Lynch's design are the writings of his key teachers, Dalibor Veseley, Joseph Rykwert, and Peter Carl.

In an article entitled Measuring Matter and Memory, Lynch cites the writings of the American artist Robert Irwin to support his idea of creativity as mental topography, and the role that imagination plays in forgetting the name of the thing that is seen.

== Selected projects ==
The practice's first significant project, Marsh View in the wetlands of Norfolk, remodeled a bungalow to create a two-level house whose unusual form was anchored to a mound-like chimney corner. The building suggests an archaic mode of inhabitation, based around a hearth or temple.

The Kingsgate House scheme in Victoria, for developers Land Securities, replaced a massive slab-block in central London with two new buildings and urban landscaping. The articulated form and crafted detail of the mixed-use buildings includes elements by two artists, Rut Blees Luxemburg and Joel Tomlin.

The Victoria Public Library, also for Land Securities, is part of a development called Victoria Circle, with other buildings by Benson and Forsyth and PLP. Lynch's design proposal sits beside the listed 19th century Victoria Palace Theatre and includes affordable housing as well as the library, and a small office block that involves the reconstruction of a listed façade. The project will accommodate sculptures by a number of artists, including Hilary Koob-Sassen.

The design of the Madder 139 Gallery in Whitecross Street, Clerkenwell, London, converted two Georgian terrace houses, into galleries on the ground floor and in a double-height basement and rear courtyard.

Lynch Architects contributed a 36-house scheme to the development masterplan for Brent Cross and Cricklewood drawn up by Allies and Morrison. Lynch's design expresses a modern, strongly anti-pastiche interpretation of Georgian terraced housing.

The practice's competition-winning scheme for Barking Abbey Green will create a series of structures whose abstracted forms are derived from the deeper history of the site. Their competition design for the Giant's Causeway Visitor Centre expressed recent history, geography, ancient myths and geological time. Lynch Architects have also been shortlisted to design an intervention that will accentuate the presence of Westminster Cathedral’s piazza.

== Teaching and writing ==
Patrick Lynch has taught at the Architectural Association, University College Dublin, London Metropolitan University and Kingston University, and lectured at the Cooper Union in New York City, the Casa da Musica, Porto, and the University of Pennsylvania. His written work includes the book ‘The Theatricality of the Baroque City: The Zwinger and Dresden’; a chapter in ‘Why do architects love his buildings? Jim Stirling and the Red Trilogy: Three Radical Buildings’; and the long essay ‘Everything Flows: The Architecture of O’Donnell & Tuomey’.
