= Felipe Hernandez (architect) =

Felipe Hernández is a Colombian-born architect who lives and works in the United Kingdom. He is Associate Professor of Architecture and Urban Studies in the Department of Architecture, and Fellow Architect and Director of Studies at King's College, Cambridge.

Hernández has worked extensively on Latin America and other areas Global South, including Africa, South East Asia and the Caribbean.

His research explores the intersection between architecture, urbanism in conditions of 'coloniality', understood as the continued existence of colonial principles in the study of architecture and the materialisation of cities.

Between 2018 and 2021 he acted as the first Latin American Director of the Centre of Latin American Studies at the University of Cambridge.

== Publications ==
=== Authored books ===
- Hernández, F. (2010) Bhabha for Architects. London – New York: Routledge.
- Hernández, F. (2009) Beyond Modernist Masters: Latin American Architecture Today. Basel – Berlin – Boston: Birkhäuser.

=== Edited volumes ===
- Lara, F. and F. Hernández (eds) (2021) Decolonising the Spatial History of the Americas. Austin: Center for American Architecture and Design.
- Lara, F. and F. Hernández (eds) (2021) Spatial Concepts for the Americas. Newcastle upon Tyne: Cambridge Scholars Publishing.
- Hernández, F. and A. Becerra Santacruz (eds) (2017) Marginal Urbanisms: Informal and Formal Development in Cities of Latin America. Newcastle: Cambridge Scholar Publishing.
- Hernández, F., P. Kellett and L. Allen (eds) (2012). Rethinking the Informal City: Critical Perspectives from Latin America. Paperback edition. Oxford – New York: Berghahn Books.
- Hernández, F., P. Kellett and L. Allen (eds) (2009). Rethinking the Informal City: Critical Perspectives from Latin America. Hardback edition. Oxford – New York: Berghahn Books.
- Hernández, F., M. Millington and I. Borden (eds) (2005). Transculturation: Cities, Spaces and Architectures in Latin America. Amsterdam – Atlanta: Rodopi.

=== Especial journal issues edited ===
- Hernández, F. and F. L. Lara (Guest Editors) (2021) ‘Colombia desde fuera/Colombia from the Outside’, in Dearq Journal of Architecture, 29.
- Hernández, F. (ed.) (2002). ‘Transcultural Spaces: Architecture and Identity in Latin America’, in Journal of Romance Studies, 2.3.
