= Joanna Bacon =

British architect

- Born: Joanna Hermione Seager Bacon
- Education: Robinson College, University of Cambridge (1980)
- Occupation: Architect
- Awards: Woman Architect of the Year 2015 shortlist
- Practice: Allies and Morrison
- Projects: 100 Bishopsgate, BBC White City Media Village
- Website: www.alliesandmorrison.com

Joanna Hermione Seager Bacon is a British architect, who was shortlisted for the Woman Architect of the Year award in 2015. She has worked at Allies and Morrison since 1987 and is a managing partner.

== Biography ==
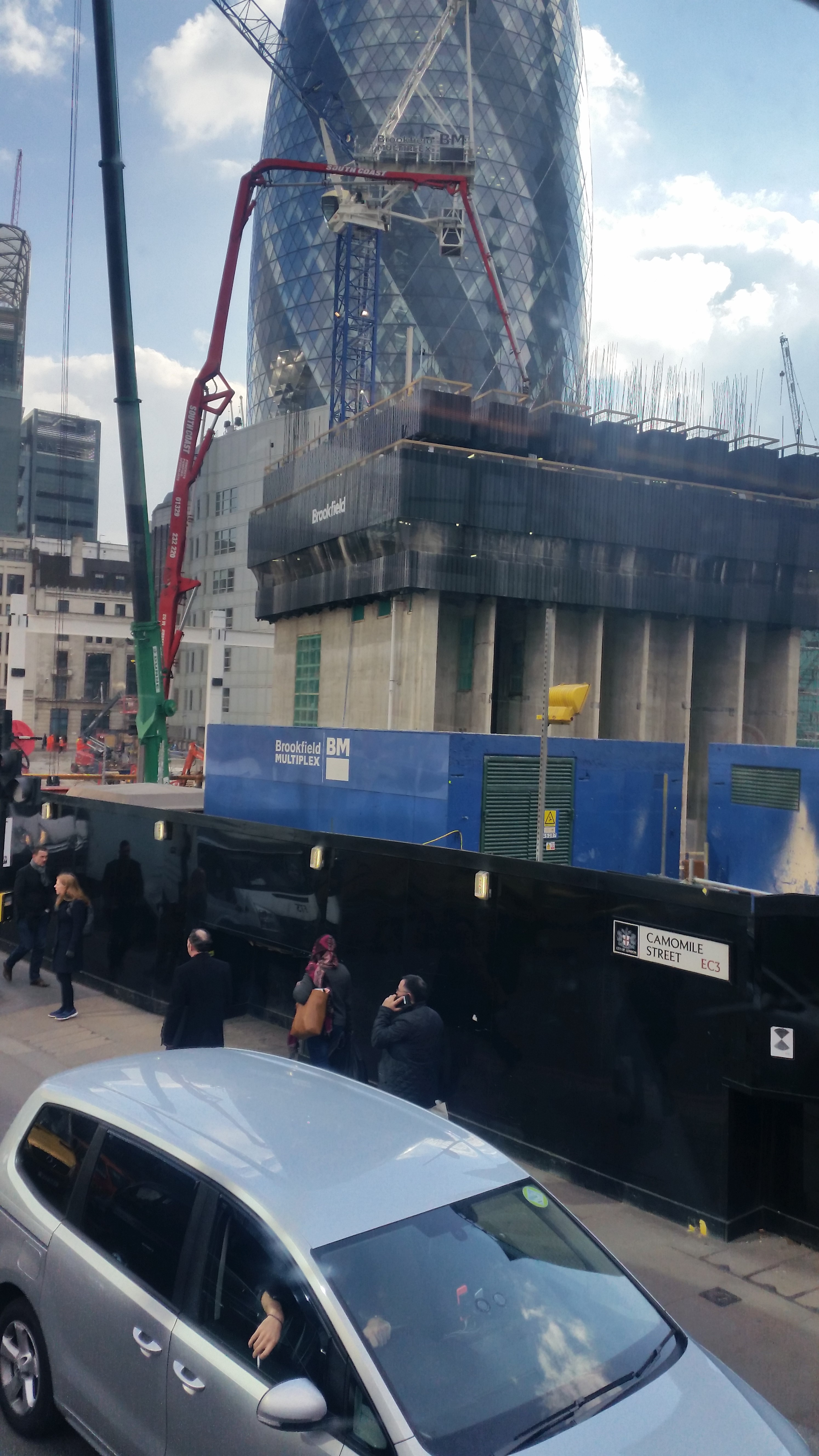
100 Bishopsgate

Joanna Bacon studied at Robinson College, Cambridge under Bob Allies from Allies and Morrison. She completed her studies in 1980.

Bacon joined Allies and Morrison in 1987 and became a managing partner in 2012. She was the partner in charge of work on the BBC Media Village, the Royal Festival Hall refurbishment and 100 Bishopsgate project (completed in 2011).

Bacon worked on new buildings for the University of Cambridge, Sidgwick Site Faculty of English and Cambridge Institute of Criminology.

In 2022 Bacon was a presidential candidate for the Royal Institute of British Architects and is now a Trustee, Chair of the Awards Group and a board member.

Bacon is an active supporter of Women in architecture and the Architectural Association School of Architecture.
