= Allies and Morrison =

British architectural firm

Practice information
- Partners: Alex Wraight, Alfredo Caraballo, Antony Rifkin, Artur Carulla, Bob Allies, Chris Bearman, Graham Morrison, Hendrik Heyns, Jason Syrett, Joanna Bacon, Miles Leigh, Paul Eaton, Robert Maxwell, Simon Gathercole, Angie Jim Osman, Daniel Elsea, Louise Mansfield
- Founded: 1984
- Location: London, Cambridge, Manchester, Dublin, Jeddah, Toronto

Significant works and honors
- Buildings: UAL's London College of Fashion, King's Cross

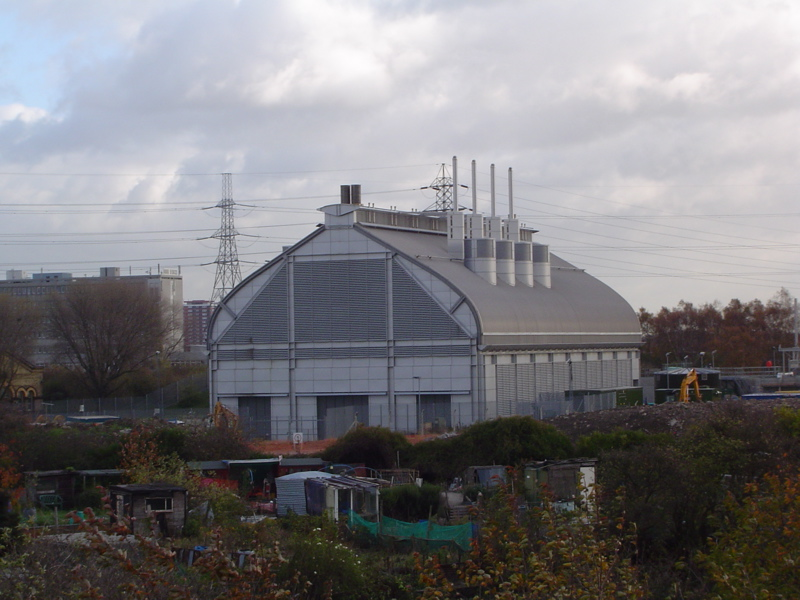
Abbey Mills Pumping Station, Stratford

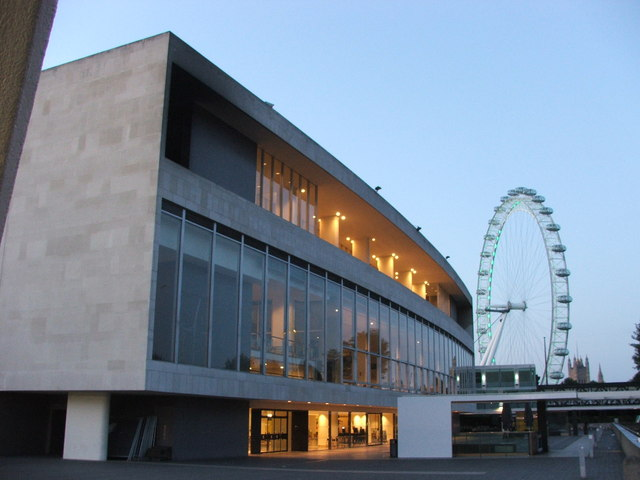
Royal Festival Hall post refurbishment

Allies and Morrison LLP is an architecture and urban planning practice based in London, with studios in Cambridge, Manchester, Dublin, Jeddah and Toronto. Founded in 1984, the practice is now one of Britain's largest architectural firms. The practice's work ranges from architecture and interior design to conservation and renovation of historic buildings to urbanism, planning, consultation and research. The firm's notable projects include the redevelopment of the Royal Festival Hall, the masterplan for the Queen Elizabeth Olympic Park, BBC Media Village and the redevelopment of King's Cross Central. The practice has a reputation for designing modernist, yet stylistically restrained buildings.

They have completed projects throughout the UK, and in Ireland, India, Africa and the Middle East and in North America. The practice's portfolio includes cultural, educational, public and housing projects.

== Work ==
Buildings designed by Allies and Morrison include:

- Abbey Mills Pumping Station
- BBC Media Village, White City, London
- Brighton College Simon Smith Building
- Charles Street Car Park, Sheffield
- Chelsea College of Arts
- New home for London College of Fashion, Stratford
- New campus for London College of Communication, Elephant and Castle
- Fitzwilliam College, Cambridge University
- Ash Court, Library and Archive at Girton College, Cambridge University
- Highbury Square, redevelopment of Arsenal Stadium
- Horniman Museum extension
- London King's Cross railway station-St Pancras railway station Link
- Maurice Wohl Clinical Neuroscience Institute, King's College London
- Merton College, Oxford University
- University of Cambridge Sidgwick Site new buildings: Faculty of English and Cambridge Institute of Criminology
- Rambert Dance Company, South Bank, London
- Restoration of Queen's House, Greenwich
- Royal Albert Memorial Museum, Exeter
- Royal Festival Hall refurbishment
- Renovation and extension of Royal Observatory, Greenwich
- Sam Wanamaker Playhouse at Shakespeare's Globe
- South Yorkshire Police headquarters, Sheffield
- Two Fifty One mixed-use development, Elephant and Castle, London

Allies and Morrison masterplans include:

- King's Cross Central
- Madinat al Irfan, urban extension to Muscat
- Msheireb Downtown Doha
- Queen Elizabeth Olympic Park games and legacy masterplans (with EDAW)
- Stratford Waterfront, Queen Elizabeth Olympic Park Cultural and Education District
- Wood Wharf, extension to Canary Wharf, London
- Canada Water, London

The practice has won 41 RIBA Awards, 18 Civic Trust Awards and the 2015 AJ120 Practice of the Year award.
