= Phenomenology (architecture) =

Philosophical study of architecture

Architectural phenomenology is the discursive and realist attempt to understand and embody the philosophical insights of phenomenology within the discipline of architecture. The phenomenology of architecture is the philosophical study of architecture employing the methods of phenomenology. David Seamon defines it as "the descriptive and interpretive explication of architectural experiences, situations, and meanings as constituted by qualities and features of both the built environment and human life".

Architectural phenomenology emphasizes human experience, background, intention and historical reflection, interpretation, and poetic and ethical considerations in contrast to the anti-historicism of postwar modernism and the pastiche of postmodernism. Much like phenomenology itself, architectural phenomenology is better understood as an orientation toward thinking and making rather than a specific aesthetic or movement. Interest in phenomenology within architectural circles began in the 1950s, reached a wide audience in the late 1970s and 1980s, and continues today.

== Historical development ==
=== Origins ===
Edmund Husserl is credited with founding Phenomenology, as a philosophical approach to understanding experience, in the early 20th century. The emergence of Phenomenology occurred during a period of extensive transformation referred to as Modernism. During this time, Western society was experiencing rapid technological advances and social change. Concurrently, as the theory and practice of architecture adapted to these changes, Modern architecture emerged. Consistent within the broad context of Modernism which was characterized by the rejection of tradition, both phenomenology and modern architecture were focused on how humans experience their environments. While Phenomenology was focused on how humans can know things and spaces, modern architecture was concerned with how to create the places of human experience aligned to the modernist ethos of the time.

The early approaches to fit the architecture within the phenomenological framework started in the 1940s.

Husserl's method of eidetic reduction allows the mind to abstract the raw and transitory sensory data - colors and shapes in case of architecture - into the "essences", the timeless architectural forms. This suggestion of seamless synthesis of past experience, present senses, and premonitions suited very well the school of Romantic architecture by providing absolute judgements on rights and wrongs without rationalizing and devolving into science.

=== Early Architectural Studies (1950s-1960s) ===
Architects first started seriously studying phenomenology at Princeton University in the 1950s under the influence of Jean Labatut. In the 1950s, architect Charles W. Moore conducted some of the first phenomenological studies of architecture during his doctoral studies under Labatut, drawing heavily on the philosopher Gaston Bachelard, which were published in 1958 as Water and Architecture. In Europe, Milanese architect Ernesto Nathan Rogers advanced architectural phenomenology during the 1950s and early 1960s through his influential editorship of the Italian design magazine Casabella Continuità. He collaborated with philosopher Enzo Paci and influenced a generation of young architects including Vittorio Gregotti and Aldo Rossi.

=== Environment-behavioral studies (1970s-early 1980s) ===
A interdisciplinary field of environment-behavior studies (EBS) was introduced into multiple American, Canadian, and British architecture programs in the 1970s. Also called "architectural psychology," "behavioral geography," "environmental psychology," or "human factors in design," the discipline is associated with Christopher Alexander, Kevin A. Lynch, and Oscar Newman. While most of the EBS research was positivist, the thought behind it influenced the phenomenologically inclined "humanistic geographers" (Edward Relph, Yi-Fu Tuan).

=== The Essex School (1970s-1980s) ===
In the 1970s, the School of Comparative Studies at the University of Essex, under the direction of Dalibor Vesely and Joseph Rykwert, was a breeding ground for a generation of architectural phenomenologists, including David Leatherbarrow, Alberto Pérez-Gómez, and Daniel Libeskind. In the 1980s, Vesely and his colleague Peter Carl continued to develop architectural phenomenology in their research and teaching at the Department of Architecture at the University of Cambridge. As architectural phenomenology became established in academia, professors expanded its considerations through theory seminars beyond Gaston Bachelard and Martin Heidegger, to include Edmund Husserl, Maurice Merleau-Ponty, Hans-Georg Gadamer, Hannah Arendt and theorists whose modes of thinking bordered on phenomenology, including Gilles Deleuze, Henri Bergson, Paul Virilio, Charles Taylor, Hubert Dreyfus and Edward S. Casey. George Baird called the Essex School "the most significant recent mode of phenomenology in current architectural theory" and credits Vesely for architectural phenomenology's historical reliance on Heidegger instead of Merleau-Ponty, who was championed by Rykwert, Moore, and Labatut. During the 1980s, Kenneth Frampton became an influence in architectural phenomenology.

In 1979, Norwegian architect, theorist and historian Christian Norberg-Schulz's book Genius Loci: Towards a Phenomenology of Architecture became an important reference for those interested in the topic in the 1980s for its readily accessible explanations for how a such an approach could be translated into design. The book was markedly influenced by Martin Heidegger's hermeneutic ontology. Norberg-Schulz spawned a wide following, including his successor at the Oslo School of Architecture, Thomas Thiis-Evensen.

=== Contemporary Architectural Phenomenology (2010-present) ===
Recent scholarly activity in architectural phenomenology draws on contemporary phenomenology and philosophy of mind authors Gallagher and Zahavi. Some examples include a 2018 issue of Log with the theme "Disorienting phenomenology" as well as Jorge Otero-Pailos' Architecture's Historical Turn, Sara Ahmed's Queer Phenomenology, Dylan Trigg's The Thing, Alexander Weheliye's Habeas Viscus, and Joseph Bedford's dissertation Creativity's Shadow: Dabilor Vesely, Phenomenology and Architectural Education (1968 - 1989). With the expansion of virtual reality as architectural experiences there is new attention to Phenomenology. Heather Renee Barker's Designing Post-Virtual Architectures, Wicked Tactics and World Building addresses the phenomenological method and the life-world within this context. Contemporary scholarship has become more skeptical of Heidegger's influence. The phenomenology has been gradually displaced in the architectural theory by other "cutting-edge" ideas since 1980, but remains associated with works of Alvar Aalto, Tadao Ando, Steven Holl, Louis Kahn, Aldo van Eyck, and Peter Zumthor.

== Themes ==
=== Dwelling ===
As a phenomenological perspective on being in society and dwelling within a social world took focus, expanded interest in the urban and social experience became central to the thinking of social philosophers like Alfred Schutz. The phenomenon of dwelling, as explicated in Heidegger's essay "Building Dwelling Thinking" (originally published in 1954 as "Bauen Wohnen Denken"), became an important theme in architectural phenomenology. Heidegger links dwelling to the "gathering of the fourfold," namely the regions of being entailed by the phenomena of "the saving of earth, the reception of sky (heavens), the initiation of mortals into their death, and the awaiting/remembering of divinities." The essence of dwelling is not architectural, per se, in the same manner that the essence of technology for him is not technological per se.

=== Environmental embodiment ===
Environmental embodiment is the perceptual awareness of a person ("lived body") in its interaction with the lifeworld (for example, a person "sees the springiness of steel” or “hear[s] the hardness and unevenness of cobbles in the rattle of a carriage”). According to Juhani Pallasmaa, the 21st century buildings are too heavy on being visually striking and need more "multivalent sensuousness". Thomas Thiis-Evensen suggests emphasizing the relationship between indoors and outdoors, established by floor, walls, and roof, through "existential expressions" of motion, weight, and substance. "Motion" corresponds to the perception of dynamics, visual inertia (does an element appear to expand? be stable?); "weight" to the element looking heavy (or light); "substance" is the appearance of the material (does the surface look like it will be cold to touch? soft?).

Body routine is a set of gestures, behaviors, and actions used to achieve a particular task. Phenomenologists believe that proper architectural design can combine bodily routines of multiple bodies into a converged "place ballet", when interpersonal exchanges occur in an office lounge or shopping mall. The space-syntax theory declares that particular spatial arrangements of walkways (for example, corridors or sidewalks) can result either in encounters or feeling of isolation.

Bodies and places are interdependent (they "interanimate" each other). This is visible, for example, in a concept of shop/house suggested by Howard Davis, a building type that, in different historical forms, contains both the residence and a place of business.

== Notable architects ==
Notable architects and scholars of architecture associated with architectural phenomenology include:

- George Baird
- Nader El-Bizri
- Kenneth Frampton
- Marco Frascari
- Vittorio Gregotti
- Steven Holl
- David Leatherbarrow
- Daniel Libeskind
- Charles W. Moore
- Christian Norberg-Schulz
- Mohsen Mostafavi
- Juhani Pallasmaa
- Alberto Pérez-Gómez
- Steen Eiler Rasmussen
- Ernesto Nathan Rogers
- Joseph Rykwert
- Dalibor Vesely
- Peter Zumthor

== See also ==
- Architectural theory
- Atmosphere (architecture and spatial design)
- Critical Regionalism
- Khôra

== Bibliography ==
Major Works

- Gaston Bachelard, 1969 [1957]. The Poetics of Space, trans. Maria Jolas. Boston: Beacon Press.
- Kent Bloomer and Charles Moore, 1977. Body, Memory and Architecture. New Haven: Yale University Press.
- Kenneth Frampton, 1974. "On Reading Heidegger." Oppositions 4 (October 1974), unpaginated.
- Karsten Harries, 1980. "The Dream of the Complete Building." Perspecta: The Yale Journal of Architecture 17: 36-43.
- Karsten Harries, 1982. "Building and the Terror of Time." Perspecta: The Yale Journal of Architecture 19: 59-69.
- Karsten Harries, 1997. The Ethical Function of Architecture. Cambridge, Massachusetts: MIT Press.
- Martin Heidegger, 1971 [1927]. Poetry, Language, Thought, trans. Albert Hofstadter. New York: Harper & Row.
- Martin Heidegger, 1973. "Art and Space", trans. Charles Siebert. Man and World, 1973, Fall 6: 3–8.
- Steven Holl, Juhani Pallasmaa, and Alberto Pérèz-Gomez, 1994. Questions of Perception: Phenomenology of Architecture. A&U Special Issue, July 1994.
- Christian Norberg-Schulz, 1971. Existence, Space and Architecture. New York: Praeger.
- Christian Norberg-Schulz, 1976. "The Phenomenon of Space." Architectural Association Quarterly 8, no. 4: 3-10.
- Christian Norberg-Schulz, 1980. Genius Loci: Towards a Phenomenology of Architecture. New York: Rizzoli.
- Christian Norberg-Schulz, 1983. "Heidegger's Thinking on Architecture." Perspecta: The Yale Architectural Journal 20: 61-68.
- Christian Norberg-Schulz, 1985 [1984]. The Concept of Dwelling: On the Way to Figurative Architecture. New York: Electa/Rizzoli.
- Juhani Pallasmaa, 1986. "The Geometry of Feeling: A Look at the Phenomenology of Architecture." Skala: Nordic Journal of Architecture and Art 4: 22-25.
- Juhani Pallasmaa, 1996. The Eyes of the Skin: Architecture and the Senses. New York: Wiley.
- Steen Eiler Rasmussen, 1959 [1957]. Experiencing Architecture. Cambridge, Massachusetts: MIT Press.
- Fred Rush, 2009. On Architecture. London & New York: Routledge.
- M. Reza Shirazi, 2014. Towards an Articulated Phenomenological Interpretation of Architecture: Phenomenal Phenomenology. London: Routledge.
- Thomas Thiis-Evensen, 1987. Archetypes in Architecture. Oxford: Oxford University Press.
- Dalibor Vesely, 1988. "On the Relevance of Phenomenology." Pratt Journal of Architecture 2: 59-62.
- Pierre von Meiss, 1990 [1986]. Elements of Architecture: From Form to Place. London, E & FN Spon.

Further Reading

- Dennis Pohl, 2018, "Heidegger's Architects," in: Environmental & Architectural Phenomenology, Vol. 29, No. 1:19–20.
- Nader El-Bizri, 2011. "Being at Home Among Things: Heidegger's Reflections on Dwelling." Environment, Space, Place, Vol. 3:47–71.
- Nader El-Bizri, 2015. "On Dwelling: Heideggerian Allusions to Architectural Phenomenology." Studia UBB Philosophia 60: 5–30.
- Benoît Jacquet & Vincent Giraud, eds., 2012. From the Things Themselves: Architecture and Phenomenology. Kyoto and Paris: Kyoto University Press and Ecole française d'Extrême-Orient. ISBN 978-4-8769-8235-6
- Maurice Merleau-Ponty, 1962 [1945]. The Phenomenology of Perception, trans. Colin Smith. New York: Humanities Press.
- Mohsen Mostafavi and David Leatherbarrow, 1993. On Weathering: The Life of Buildings in Time. Cambridge, Massachusetts: MIT Press.
- Kate Nesbitt, ed., 1996. Theorizing a New Agenda for Architecture: An Anthology of Architectural Theory 1965-1995. New York: Princeton Architectural Press.
- Christian Norberg-Schulz, 1965. Intentions in Architecture. Cambridge, Massachusetts: MIT Press.
- Christian Norberg-Schulz, 1988. Architecture: Meaning and Place. New York: Rizzoli.
- Alberto Pérez-Gómez, 1983. Architecture and the Crisis of Modern Science. Cambridge, Massachusetts: MIT Press.
- Steen Eiler Rasmussen, 1959. Experiencing Architecture. Cambridge, Massachusetts: MIT Press.
- David Seamon & Robert Mugerauer eds.,1985. Dwelling, Place & Environment: Towards a Phenomenology of Person and World. Dordrecht, Netherlands: Martinus Nijhoff.
- Adam Sharr, 2007. Heidegger for Architects. London and New York: Routledge.
- Dalibor Vesely, 2004. Architecture in the Age of Divided Representation: The Question of Creativity in the Shadow of Production. Cambridge, Massachusetts: MIT Press.

== Sources ==
- Gelernter, Mark (1995). Sources of Architectural Form: A Critical History of Western Design Theory. Manchester University Press. ISBN 978-0-7190-4129-7.
- Seamon, David (2018). "Architecture and Phenomenology". In Lu, Duanglang (ed.). The Routledge Companion to Contemporary Architectural History. Routledge. pp. 286–297. ISBN 978-1317379256.
