= Eric Parry =

British architect (born 1952)

Eric Parry CBE RA
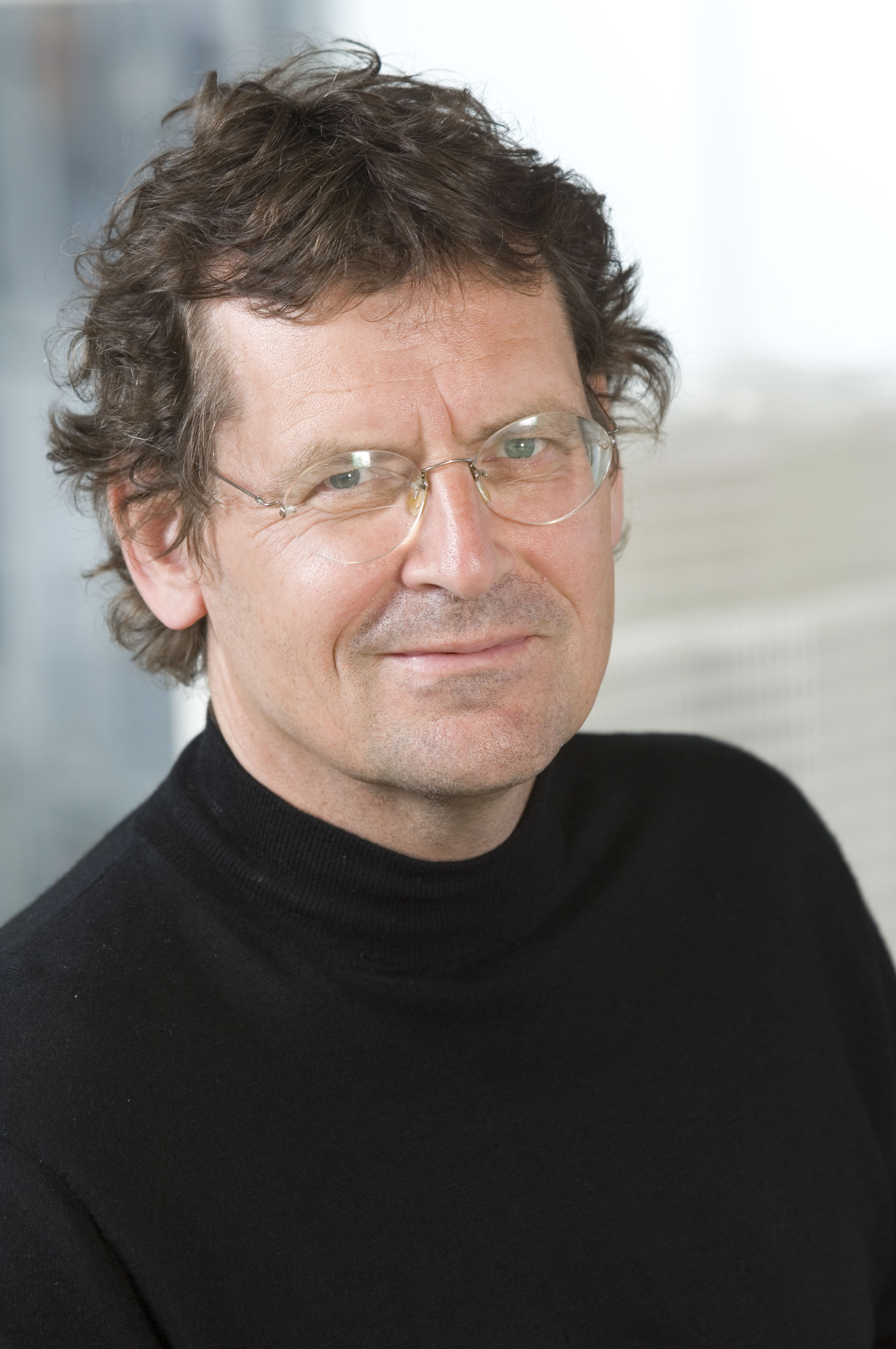
- Eric Parry in 2008
- Born: 24 March 1952 (age 74); Kuwait City, Kuwait
- Education: Newcastle University, Royal College of Art, Architectural Association School of Architecture
- Occupation: Architect
- Parent(s): Marion Parry (Mother); Eric Parry (Father)
- Practice: Eric Parry Architects
- Buildings: St Martin-in-the-Fields; 8 St James's Square; Holburne Museum; 50 New Bond Street; 23 Savile Row; One Eagle Place, Piccadilly; Timothy Taylor Gallery; London Stock Exchange
- Website: www.ericparryarchitects.co.uk

Eric Owen Parry CBE RA (born 24 March 1952) is a British architect, designer, writer and educator. Parry is the founder and principal of Eric Parry Architects established in London in 1983. His built work includes the restoration and renewal of St Martin-in-the-Fields in London, the Holburne Museum in Bath, 50 New Bond Street, 23 Savile Row, One Eagle Place in Piccadilly, Aldermanbury Square by London Wall, 30 Finsbury Square in London, and the London Stock Exchange. His projects also include a number of residential developments. Eric Parry's architectural work and design has been shown internationally on major exhibitions, including the Royal Academy of Arts, the British School at Rome, and the 2012 Venice Biennale of Architecture.

== Personal life ==
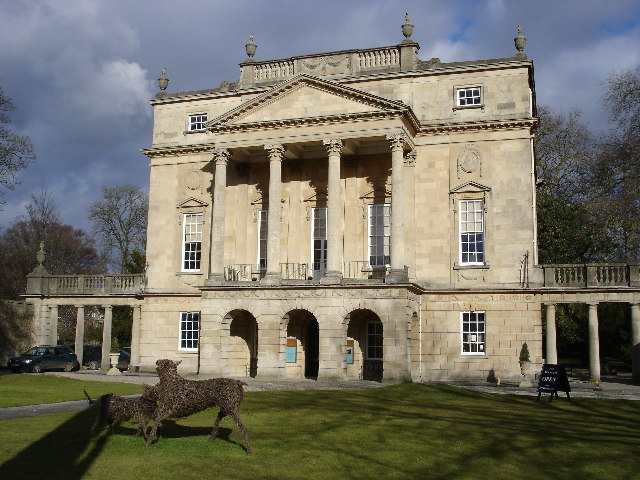
Holburne Museum, Bath, restoration and renewal, 2002–2011

Born in Kuwait City, Kuwait on 24 March 1952, to British parents Marion and Eric Parry, Parry's father was Chief Medical Officer in the Kuwaiti health service between 1948 and 1962. In his book Context: Architecture and the Genius of Place (2015), Parry alludes to his memories of growing up in Kuwait within sight of the nomadic life of Bedouin tribes. Later moving to Britain, Parry was educated at Shrewsbury School. From 1970, he attended Newcastle University School of Architecture, Planning and Landscape, graduating with a Bachelor of Arts' degree in architecture in 1973. He later registered with the Royal College of Arts, where he obtained his Master of Arts in 1978. Parry completed his formal architectural education at the Architectural Association School of Architecture, where he was taught by Dalibor Vesely and Peter Carl, both of whom he would again later encounter while teaching in Cambridge. Parry obtained his Diploma in Architecture by the Architectural Association in 1980. He taught at the Cambridge Department of Architecture from 1983 to 1997, as a lecturer in architecture. Parry was conferred an honorary Master of Arts by the University of Cambridge, and is a member of Peterhouse, Cambridge. In 2006, Parry was elected at the Royal Academy of Arts, and in 2012 received the degree of Doctor of Arts Honoris Causa from the University of Bath.

In 2024 Parry was made a Vice President of the National Churches Trust.

== Professional life ==
Eric Parry began his professional life as a lecturer at the Department of Architecture, University of Cambridge from 1983 to 1997. Since then he has taught at numerous universities, including the Graduate School of Design, Harvard University, the University of Houston and the Tokyo Institute of Technology, Japan. He founded Eric Parry Architects in London in 1983. His early work included Artists' Studios in London for Antony Gormley and Tom Phillips, completed in 1988, as well as a private rehabilitation of the Château de Paulin in Tarn, France, which included the work of sculptor Stephen Cox. From this period dates also his masterplan for Pembroke College, Cambridge that was followed in 1993 by the project for the college's New Lodge and Student Accommodation. This was accompanied by a number of invited competition entries, namely for the extension of the Fitzwilliam Museum, Cambridge (1993), and to rebuild St George's Hall, Windsor Castle after the fire of 1992.

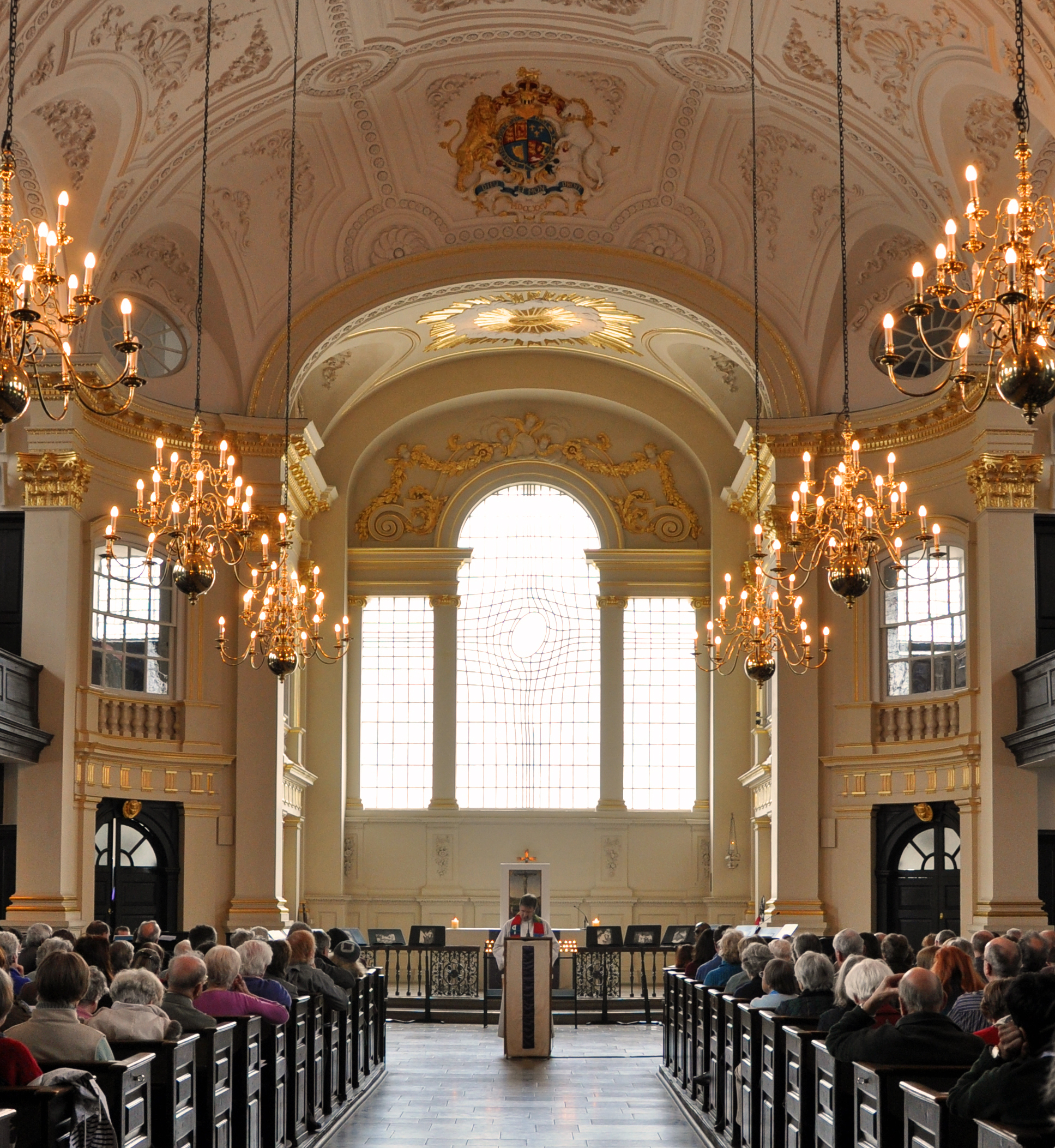
Interior of St Martin-in-the-Fields, 2002–2008

Parry's body of work also includes the corporate and commercial projects for W3 Stockley Park, completed in 1991, additional offices and conference rooms for the Royal Lancaster Hotel, London, and a complex of apartments for Damai Suria, Kuala Lumpur, Malaysia, completed in 1997. This work led to further commissions, such as the office buildings in London for 30 Finsbury Square, completed in 2002 as well as 23 Savile Row, 60 Threadneedle Street, 50 New Bond Street, all of which were completed in 2009. This involvement with the corporate world included the project for the new London Stock Exchange. At the same time, on the historical and educational fronts Parry developed a number of projects for schools, from the Bedford School Library and Music School to Wells Cathedral School Cedar's Hall completed in 2017. The cultural side to the practice is reflected in Parry's projects for London art galleries such as the Timothy Taylor Gallery in Dering Street and Carlos Place, as well as the restoration and renewal of St Martin-in-the-Fields, completed in 2008, and the Holburne Museum in Bath, Somerset. Parry's later work includes the residential building N10 for the East Village, London, formerly Olympic Village during the London 2012 Games. In 2013, Parry's completion of One Eagle Place, Piccadilly, was announced in the press, featuring a cornice by Turner Prize winner, artist Richard Deacon. The news was followed by Parry's completion of the neighbouring 8 St James's Square, a building that broke the UK office rent record.

== Work ==
The following projects are listed in Eric Parry Architects' monographs Volume 1 (2002), Volume 2 (2011) and Volume 3 (2015):

=== Completed ===
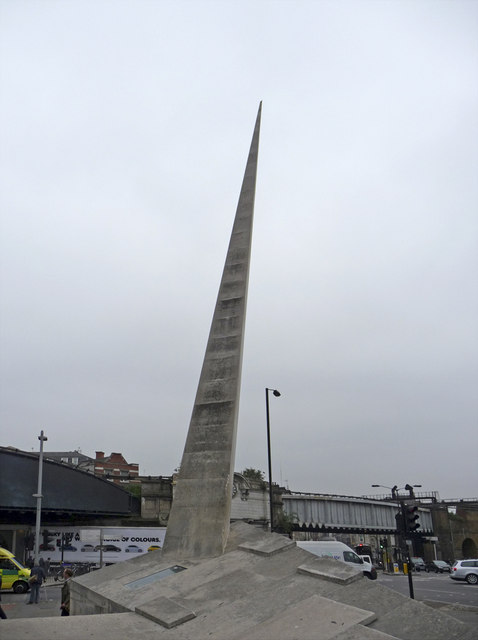
Southwark Gateway, stone obelisk, London, 1997–1999

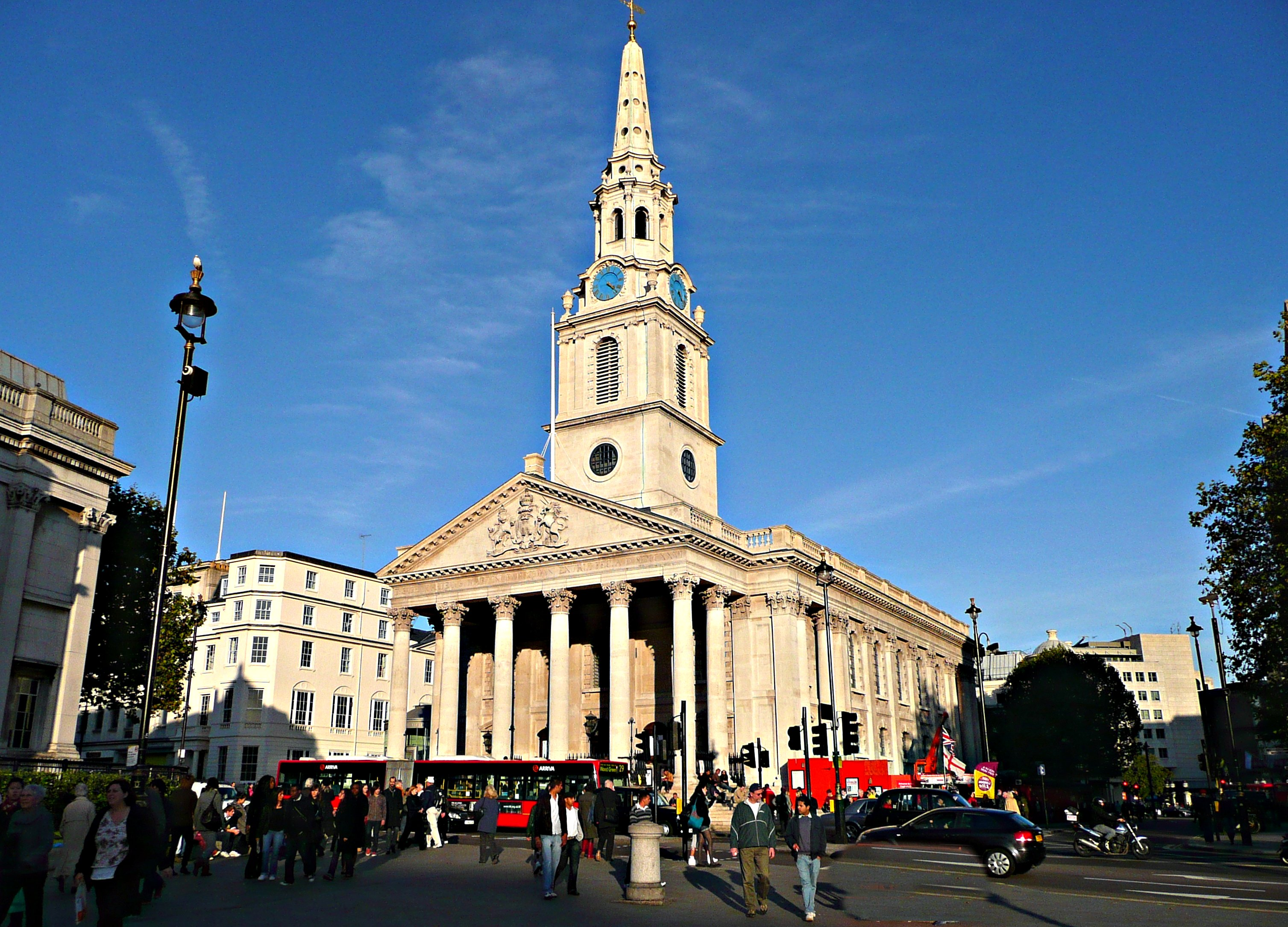
St Martin in-the-Fields, Trafalgar Square, October 2008

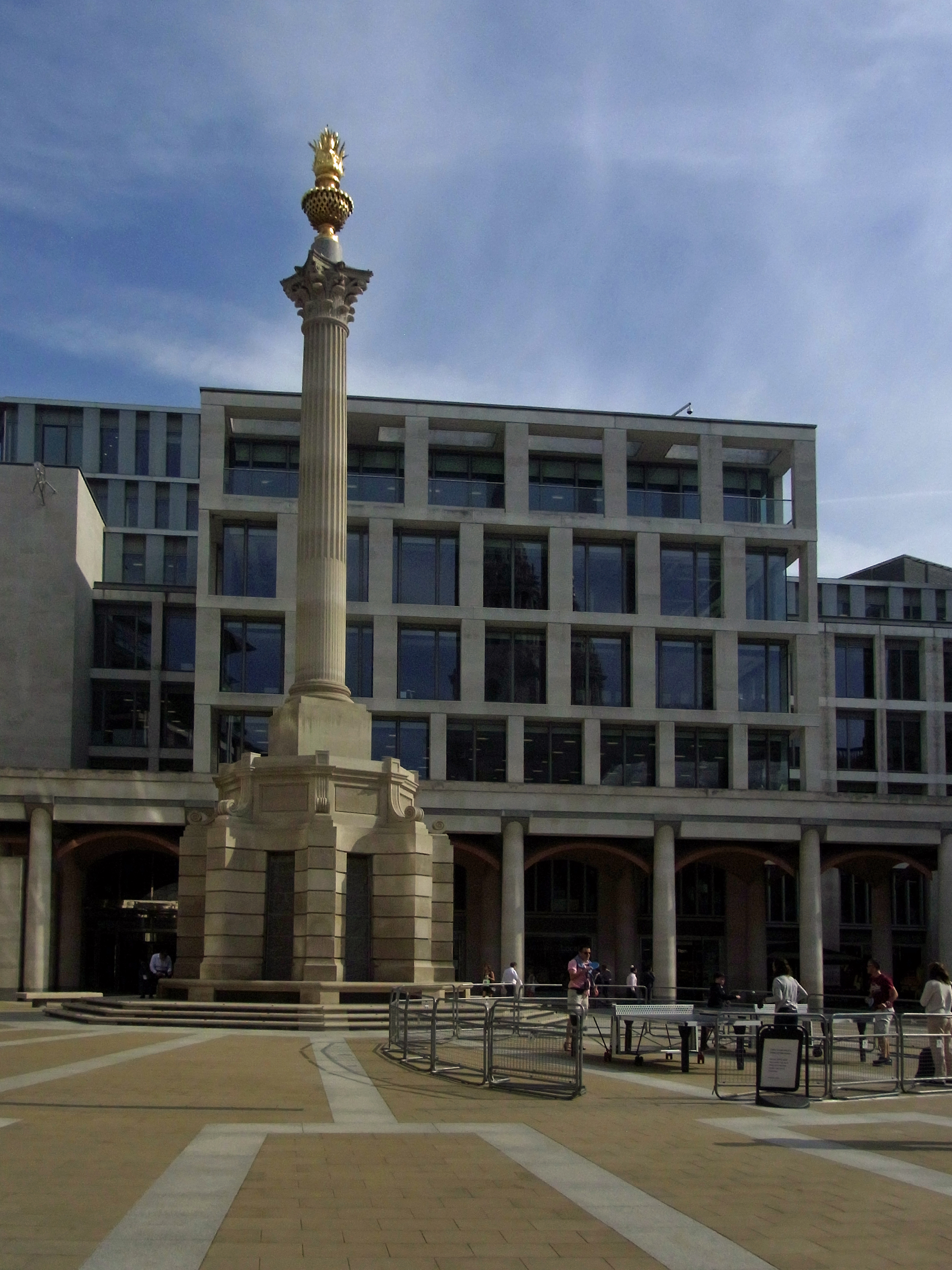
London Stock Exchange, 10 Paternoster Square, London, 1999–2003

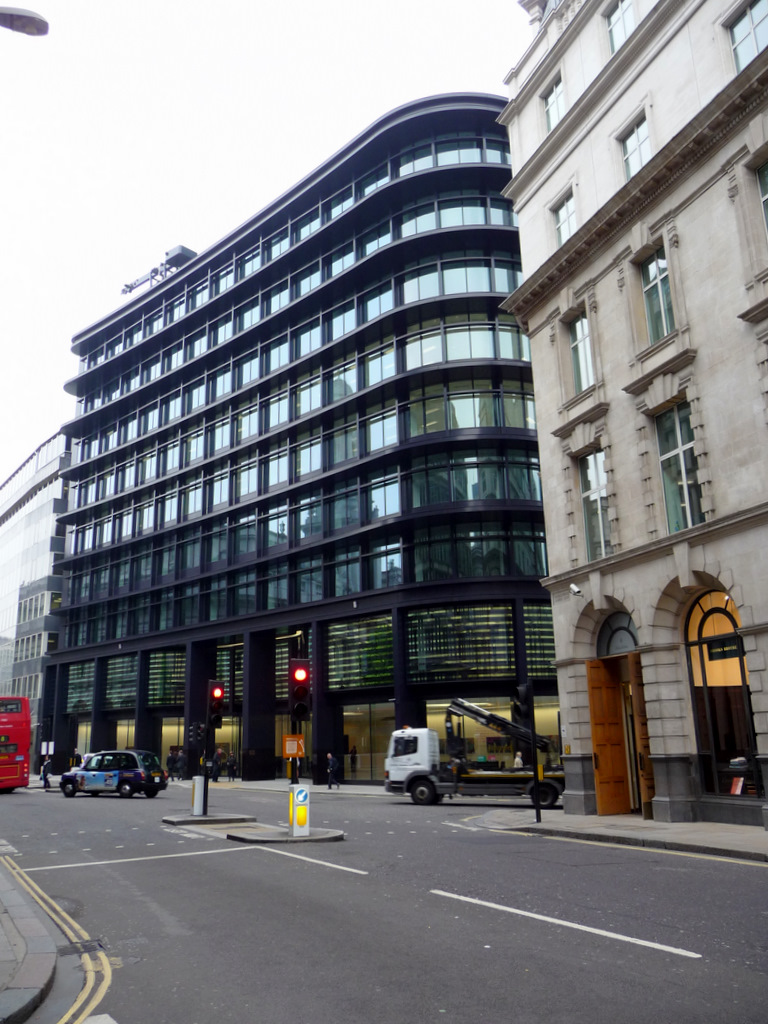
60 Threadneedle Street, London, 2004–2009

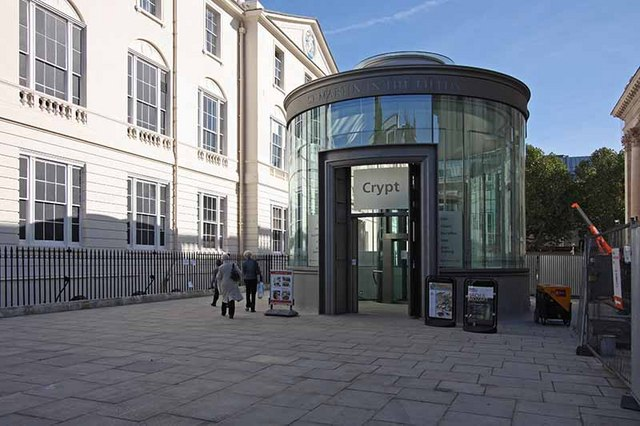
St Martin in the Fields, Trafalgar Square, entrance to The Crypt, 2002–2008

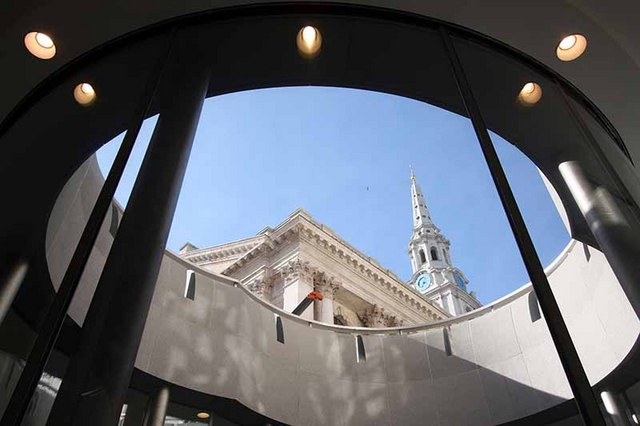
St Martin in the Fields, Trafalgar Square, view from The Crypt, 2002–2008

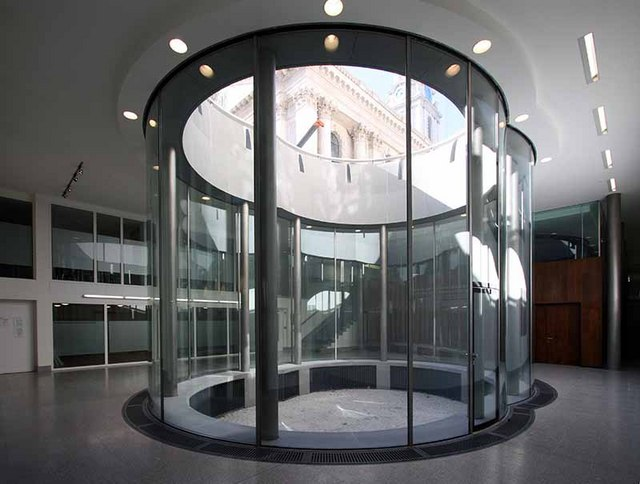
St Martin in the Fields, Trafalgar Square, light well, 2002–2008

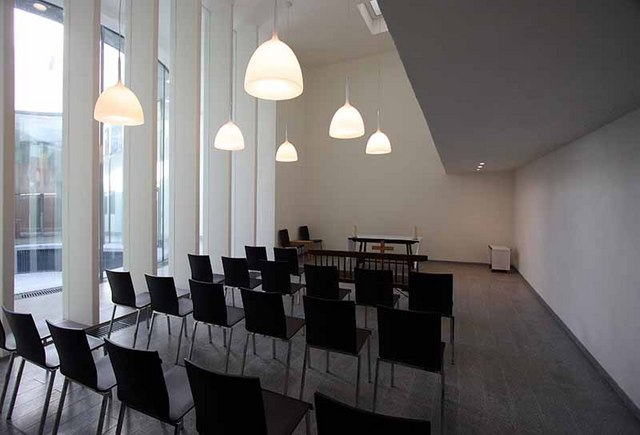
St Martin in the Fields, Dick Sheppard Chapel, 2002–2008

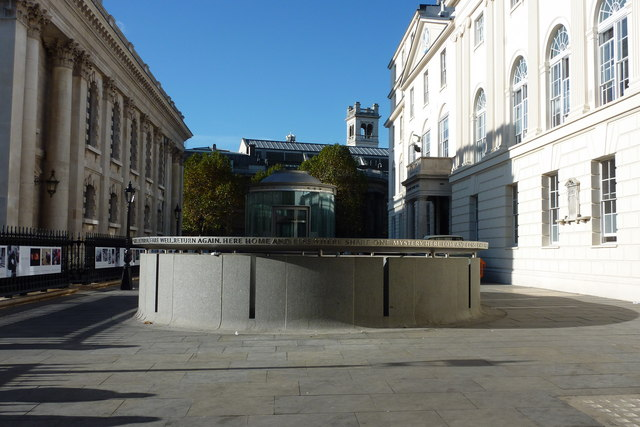
Church Path, by St Martin-in-the-Fields, 2002–2008

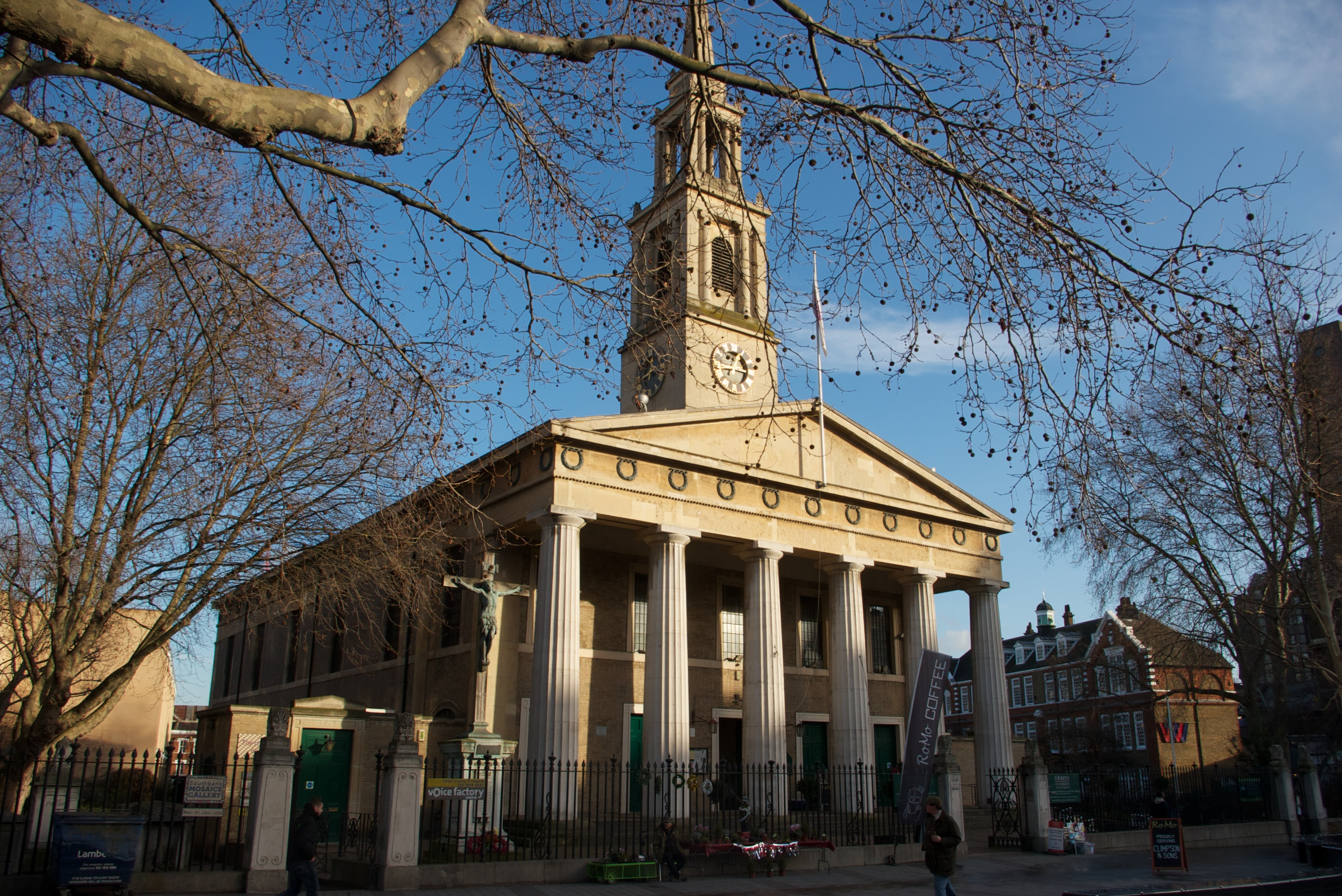
St John's Church, Waterloo, front in winter, 2010-ongoing

- 1986 ‒ Animation Graphic Design Studios, London
- 1986–1988 ‒ Artists' Studios, London
- 1987–2002 ‒ Château de Paulin, Tarn, France, with sculptor Stephen Cox
- 1988 ‒ Offices for Stanhope, London
- 1988–1990 ‒ Ferry House, South Cambridgeshire
- 1989–1991 ‒ Office Building, W3 Stockley Park, London
- 1989–1991 ‒ Market Rasen, Lincolnshire
- 1990 ‒ 'Rediscovering the Public Realm', exhibition, Heinz Gallery, RIBA
- 1990–2005 ‒ Old Wardour House, Wiltshire
- 1991 ‒ Earl Place, London, entrance
- 1991 ‒ Lipton Residence, London
- 1990–2005 ‒ Old Wardour House, Wiltshire
- 1993–1997 ‒ Pembroke College, Cambridge, New Lodge and Student Accommodation Building
- 1994 ‒ Ministry of Sound, London
- 1994–1996 ‒ Sussex Innovation Centre, Falmer, East Sussex, England
- 1995 ‒ Offices, Tras Street, Singapore
- 1996 ‒ Offices, Stornaway House, London
- 1996–1997 ‒ Damai Suria Apartments, Kuala Lumpur, Malaysia
- 1997 ‒ Agace Residence, London
- 1997–2004 ‒ Wimbledon School of Art, London
- 1997 ‒ Offices for Stanhope, London
- 1997–1998 ‒ Taylor Residence, London
- 1997–1999 ‒ Southwark Gateway, London
- 1997–2000 ‒ Mandarin Oriental Hyde Park, London
- 1997–2004 ‒ Wimbledon School of Art, London
- 1997–2004 ‒ Royal Lancaster Hotel, London
- 1998 ‒ Fashion Store, King's Road, London
- 1999–2002 ‒ 30 Finsbury Square, London
- 1999–2002 ‒ London Residence
- 1999–2003 – London Stock Exchange, 10 Paternoster Square, London
- 1998–2008 ‒ Granta Park, Amenity Building, South Cambridgeshire
- 1999–2001 ‒ London Bridge Environs, London
- 1999–2002 ‒ Offices, 30 Finsbury Square, London
- 2000 ‒ Mandarin Oriental Hotel Spa, Hyde Park, London
- 2000–2004 ‒ Gresham Street
- 2001–2003 ‒ Bedford School, Library
- 2001–2009 ‒ 23 Savile Row, London
- 2001–2007 ‒ 5 Aldermanbury Square, London
- 2002 ‒ Norfolk House, St. James's Square, London
- 2002–2005 ‒ Bedford School Music School, Bedford, England
- 2002–2008 ‒ St Martin-in-the-Fields, London
- 2002–2011 ‒ Holburne Museum, Bath, England
- 2003 ‒ Timothy Taylor Gallery, Dering Street, London
- 2004–2006 ‒ Aldermanbury Square, Landscape, London
- 2004–2009 ‒ 60 Threadneedle Street, London
- 2004–2009 ‒ 50 New Bond Street and 14 St George Street, London
- 2004–2010 ‒ Four Seasons Hotel Spa, Park Lane, London
- 2005–2010 ‒ Lyall Mews Residence, London
- 2005–2012 ‒ Lipton Residence, London
- 2005 ‒ Selfridges Entrances, London
- 2008 ‒ Chelsfield, London, offices
- 2006–2007 ‒ Babcock & Brown, London, offices
- 2006–2007 ‒ Timothy Taylor Gallery, Carlos Place, Mayfair, London
- 2008–2009 ‒ 'Palladio', exhibition, Royal Academy of Arts, London
- 2008–2012 ‒ N10 East Village (formerly Olympic Village), London
- 2008–2013 ‒ One Eagle Place, Piccadilly, London, with Richard Deacon
- 2012-2019 ‒ 120 Fenchurch Street, London (One Fen Court)

=== Under construction ===
- 2007 ‒ Cedars Hall, Wells Cathedral School, Somerset, England
- 2009 ‒ Brighton College Music and Drama Schools, Brighton, England
- 2010 ‒ 26 Albemarle Street, London

=== Proposals ===
- 1988 ‒ Pembroke College, Cambridge, masterplan
- 1989 ‒ Playground, Porto Carras, Chalkidiki, Greece
- 1989–1991 ‒ The Club Building, Chiswick Park, London
- 1990 ‒ Corpus Christi College, Cambridge, Graduate Accommodation
- 1990–1991 ‒ Pembroke College, Cambridge, Theatre
- 1992 ‒ Masterplan, Norfolk and Norwich, General District Hospital
- 1993 ‒ Fitzwilliam Museum, Cambridge
- 1993 ‒ St George's Hall, Windsor Castle
- 1993 ‒ Sports Hall, Leytonstone School, London
- 1994 ‒ The Ritz Hotel, Feasibility Study, London
- 1996 ‒ Bus Station 1, Walsall, West Midlands, England
- 1996–1999 ‒ Granta Park Masterplan, South Cambridgeshire
- 1996–2009 ‒ Iringan Hijau, Kuala Lumpur, Malaysia
- 1997 ‒ Royal Lancaster, London
- 1998 ‒ Westlakes Innovation Centre, Cumbria
- 1998 ‒ Royal Academy of Arts, London
- 1999 ‒ Lambeth Gateway, London
- 2001 ‒ Turner Contemporary, Margate, Kent, England
- 2001–2003 ‒ Royal Garden Clubhouse, Shanghai
- 2002–2005 ‒ Metropole Building and 10 Whitehall Place
- 2003 ‒ Millbank, Aberdeenshire, masterplan
- 2003 ‒ King's Cross Central, London
- 2003 ‒ 185 Park Street, London
- 2004 ‒ Grosvenor Waterside
- 2004 ‒ Boathouse 4, Portsmouth Historic Dockyard, Portsmouth
- 2005–2007 ‒ 7 & 8 St James's Square, London
- 2006 ‒ Mana Residence, Notting Hill, London
- 2006 ‒ The Selfridge Hotel, Oxford Street, London

== Design ==
Parry's work as a designer has accompanied his projects for the Sebastian + Barquet furniture gallery and Iringan Hijau in Kuala Lumpur which featured the Z-handles and Z-levers. Parry also designed furniture for the Timothy Taylor Gallery, the Timothy Taylor Table, and for the Four Seasons Hotel Spa in Park Lane. The practice also boasts two series of Vigilia Benches and Sanctuary Benches designed by Parry for St Martin-in-the-Fields. A Holburne Museum Bench was also designed for the Holburne Museum.

== Books ==
In 2015, Eric Parry published Context: Architecture and the Genius of Place describing his approach to architecture. Parry previously published two monographs on the practice's work, Volume 1 and Volume 2, with texts by Dalibor Vesely and Wilfried Wang. By the beginning of 2016, a Volume 3 was released, featuring an introduction by Dalibor Vesely and with main text by Edwin Heathcote.

== Short films ==
Parry has produced two series of short films reflecting on the City of Westminster and the City of London, as well as on the Holburne Museum in Bath, and on the construction of 4 Pancras Square. Parry has also hosted a series of seminars documented in film with Joseph Rykwert, Dalibor Vesely, Robin Middleton, Peter Carl, Alberto Pérez-Gómez and David Leatherbarrow.

== Awards ==
- RIBA Award for Wells Cathedral School, Wells (2017)
- RIBA Award for The Welding Institute, Cambridge (2017)
- Civic Voice Design Awards – Special Conservation Area Award for Wells Cathedral School, Wells (2017)
- Civic Trust Commendation for 8 St James's Square, London (2017)
- Civic Trust Commendation for Brighton College Music School, Brighton (2017)
- RIBA South West Award – Building of the Year for Wells Cathedral School, Wells (2017)
- RIBA London Awards for 5–7 St Helen's Place with The Leathersellers’ Hall, London (2017)
- RIBA East Award for The Welding Institute, Cambridge (2017)
- RIBA South West Award for Brighton College Music School, Brighton (2017)
- RIBA Award (London Region) for 8 St James's Square, London (2016)
- Construction News Awards Finalist (Project of the Year) for 8 St James's Square, London (2016)
- Sussex Heritage Trust Awards (Public and Community) for Brighton College Music School, Brighton (2016)
- City of London Building of the Year – Livery Award Commendation for The Leathersellers’ Hall, London (2016)
- The Stone Federation, National Stone Awards’ Commendation (Sustainability) for One Eagle Place, Piccadilly (2015)
- RICS Awards – Highly Commended (Commercial) for One Eagle Place, Piccadilly (2014)
- UK Property Awards (Mixed Use Development) for One Eagle Place, Piccadilly (2014)
- British Council for Offices – BCO Award (Best Commercial Workspace in London and the South East) for One Eagle Place, Piccadilly (2014)
- Doctor of Arts Honoris Causa by the University of Bath (2012)
- RIBA Award for The Holburne Museum, Bath (2012)
- RIBA Award – The Four Seasons Hotel Spa, Park Lane, London (2012)
- RIBA Award – 50 New Bond Street, London (2012)
- AJ Retrofit Awards for The Holburne Museum, Bath, 'Building of the Year' (2012)
- Pertubuhan Akitek Malaysia Award for Iringan Hijau, Kuala Lumpur (2011)
- RIBA Award for 60 Threadneedle Street, London (2010)
- Europa Nostra Conservation Award for St Martin-in-the-Fields, London (2010)
- Elected to the Royal Academy of Arts (2006)
- Shortlisted for the Stirling Prize for 30 Finsbury Square, London (2003)
- Design Excellence Award for 30 Finsbury Square, London (2003)
- Civic Trust Award Commendation for Granta Park, Cambridgeshire (2003)
- British Council for Offices – BCO Award Commendation for 30 Finsbury Square, London (2003)
- BCIA Award High Commendation for 30 Finsbury Square, London (2003)
- Natural Stone Awards Commendation for The Mandarin Oriental Hotel Spa, London (2002)
- FX Design Awards for The Spa at the Mandarin Oriental Hotel, London (2001)
- Natural Stone Awards for Southwark Gateway, London (2000)
- Natural Stone Awards High Commendation for Pembroke College, Cambridge (2000)
- RIBA Award for Southwark Gateway, Tooley Street, London (1999)
- Pertubuhan Akitek Malaysia Award for Damai Suria, Kuala Lumpur (with C'Arch) (1999)
- Civic Trust Award Commendation for Pembroke College, Cambridge (1999)
- RIBA Award for Foundress Court, Pembroke College, Cambridge (1998)

== Bibliography ==
- Parry, Eric, Context: Architecture and the Genius of Place (Wiley, 2015) ISBN 978-1-119-95271-8
- Parry, Eric; Vesely, Dalibor and Wang, Wilfried, Eric Parry Architects: Volume 1 (Black Dog, 2002 and 2011) ISBN 978-1-906-15562-9
- Parry, Eric; Vesely, Dalibor and Wang, Wilfried, Eric Parry Architects: Volume 2 (Black Dog, 2011) ISBN 978-1-906-15525-4
- Parry, Eric; Vesely, Dalibor and Heathcote, Edwin, Eric Parry Architects: Volume 3 (Artifice Books, 2015) ISBN 978-1-908-96703-9
