= IJP The Book of Surfaces =

Book about the geometry and philosophy of architectural surfaces

- Book cover
- Author: George L. Legendre
- Language: English
- Publisher: AA Publications
- Publication date: March 2003
- ISBN: 1-902902-32-7
- Text: IJP The Book of Surfaces online

IJP the book of surfaces is a book by George L. Legendre, with a foreword by Mohsen Mostafavi.

== Overview ==
IJP the Book of Surfaces was released in 2003 by the publishing arm of the London-based Architectural Association School of Architecture. The book features six essays on the notion of surface written from an architectural, philosophical, literary, mathematical, and computational angle, as well as several lighter asides ranging from cookery to poetry. These threads have been given a particular typographic and graphic design treatment meant to weave them together into a continuous narrative.

== Background and literary references ==
The book addresses some significant developments of the decade, such as the explosion of computational tools; the emergence of the 3D surface as an architectural signifier of the Digital Revolution; the profession's fascination with the formal possibilities of surface cladding; and the rise of innovative manufacturing technologies. It can be compared to contemporary titles like Mohsen Mostafavi’s and David Leatherbarrow’s Surface Architecture, an essay on the phenomenology of architectural façades, and Ellen Lupton’s collection Skin: Surface, Substance + Design, which explores the working metaphor of artificial skin in Materials science, fashion and the visual arts. By comparison, Illa Berman notes that IJP the Book of Surfaces withdraws from external cultural currents and their contexts and emerges from within the formal and computational specificity of the surface itself. As a piece of writing, it is indebted to the literary school Oulipo. Its treatment of one theme as a collection of vignettes written in different voices (linguistic, mathematical, computational, mock-literary, and pop-cultural) nods back to Raymond Queneau’s 1947 Exercises in Style, in which the same trivial event is told and re-told in different idioms.

== Form and content ==
In keeping with the literary/mathematical spirit of Oulipo, layout, typography, and pagination form an integral part of the book's thesis. The pagination taps the formal affinity between a publisher's book spread and a mathematician's surface, both of which draw on the concept of mathematical matrix. Similar mathematical references apply to the title of the work, which combines 'i' and 'j', two symbols commonly used in matrix algebra, with the symbol 'p' (for point), introduced by the author in reference to Euclidean space.

== Reception ==
The book's argument and restrained use of computer graphics by the standards of the day (dominated then as now by computer-generated renderings) elicited a mixed reception. Historians and theorists noted its withdrawal from the wider cultural context, its consistent argument, graphic sobriety, and theoretical reach. Some readers noted its lack of engagement with other pressing issues of the day, such as sustainability and ecology, as well as its blank and solipsistic tone, occasionally questionable syntax, and pedestrian graphic design. The book's reception may have reflected disagreements in the architectural community at the time over the meaning of innovation and the finality of computational tools. After 2015, similar disagreements arose between the trade press and the self-identifying avant-garde movement of architectural parametricism. Legendre has since distanced himself from the broader cultural claims of the movement).

== See also ==
- Design computing – Computing as applied to design
- Digital architecture – Architecture using digital technology
