= Dalibor Vesely =

Czech architectural historian and theorist (1934–2015)

Dalibor Vesely (19 June 1934 – 31 March 2015) was a Czech-born architectural historian and theorist who was influential through his teaching and writing in promoting the role of hermeneutics and phenomenology as part of the discourse of architecture and of architectural design.

Vesely was one of the most outstanding architectural teachers of the late twentieth century. As well as inspiring generations of students, he taught some of the current leading architects and architectural historians, such as Daniel Libeskind, Eric Parry, Alberto Pérez-Gómez, Mohsen Mostafavi and David Leatherbarrow. He began teaching at the University of Essex, before moving to the Architectural Association in London and in 1978 to the University of Cambridge Department of Architecture, where he also started an M.Phil. programme in History and Philosophy of Architecture with Peter Carl. Together with Peter Carl, his teaching and theoretical approach became associated and dominated the Cambridge Architecture School in the 1980s and early 1990s. After retiring from his full-time post in Cambridge, Vesely continued to teach there, remaining Director of Studies at Emmanuel College, Cambridge and he also taught Architectural History and Philosophy at the University of Pennsylvania, and was an Honorary Professorial Fellow at the Manchester School of Architecture. In 2005 he was recipient of the CICA Bruno Zevi Book Award granted by the International Committee of Architectural Critics for his book "Architecture in the Age of Divided Representation". In 2006 the Royal Institute of British Architects (RIBA) honoured Dalibor Vesely with the Annie Spink Award for Excellence in Architectural Education and in 2015 he was made an Honorary Fellow of the RIBA in recognition of both his lifetime contributions to architectural theory and to teaching.

== Biography ==
Vesely was born in Prague, Czechoslovakia, in 1934. He studied engineering, architecture, art history and philosophy in Prague, Munich, Paris and Heidelberg and obtained his PhD from Charles University in Prague. This was supervised by Josef Havlicek, Karel Honzik, and Jaroslav Fragner. He studied with Hans-Georg Gadamer, with whom he kept a correspondence until Gadamer's death. He stated it was the philosopher of phenomenology Jan Patočka who, in his own words, "contributed more than anyone else to [his] overall intellectual orientation and to the articulation of some of the critical topics" it was under the influence of Gadamer and Patočka that he developed the lifelong interest in the poetics and hermeneutics of architecture that defined his teaching and research. Vesely was in England with his brother in 1968 when the Soviet tanks rolled into Czechoslovakia. He stayed in London, first teaching at the Architectural Association, taking charge of the 'Unit 1' studio and then moving to the University of Essex where he and Joseph Rykwert established a master's degree in architectural history. He was invited to Cambridge by Colin St John Wilson in 1978. There he, Rykwert and Peter Carl initiated MPhil and PhD courses in the history and philosophy of architecture, thereby bringing the emerging studio culture which had been cultivated at the AA which came to define the school in the 1980s and 1990s.

== Architecture and hermeneutics ==
Vesely's work may be understood primarily as a contribution to cultural hermeneutics, and his exploration of the historical background of modern science in the sixteenth- and seventeenth centuries is particularly rich in detail and insight onto the changing nature of representation. Vesely polemises on concepts such as perspective and anamorphosis, which are traditionally understood to have taken departure from Renaissance culture. Vesely contributes to the current debate with the depth of the problem of representation; a question which has divided Western philosophy with regard to the epistemological possibility of representation and understanding of natural phenomena. The 'birth' of modern science and its increasing challenge on traditional views has also marked the divide within the possibilities of representation. In the context of the seventeenth century, this was especially clear as a polemics surrounding the nature of scientific work and philosophical understanding.

According to Vesely, the inevitable partiality of such views is at the very core of the problem that affects the cultural understanding of representation. Its contingent nature was not always understood as a divide originating all kinds of dualisms. Before modern science, representation was naturally contingent and the universal aspirations of science (metaphysics) were bound to the nature of the epistemological ground (arché). Vesely's work traces back the ontological foundations of the problem to the Greek context, helping to clarify its original meaning. In Architecture in the Age of Divided Representation (2004), Vesely presents the notion of ground as having a provisional nature, that can only be seized as a continuity of reference through different levels of representation, ranging from the more explicit, visible world down to a latent world of potential articulation. Precisely this continuity is what may allow us to address the modern, fragmented notion of representation as a task of rehabilitation, which would trace the fragment back to its original whole.

== Architecture and representation ==
Vesely's written work was mostly in articles in journals and many of the arguments developed over the years in lectures and seminars. There is thus no comprehensive overview of his thought or his range of interests. However Architecture in the Age of Divided Representation (2004), provides a summary of his thinking and this work remains the main source for understanding his approach. Many of his other ideas which were expressed in lectures and seminars remain unpublished.

=== Architecture in the Age of Divided Representation ===
In Architecture in the Age of Divided Representation (2004), Vesely sets the argument from the experience of architecture, as it constantly works through different modes of representation, including "built reality". In it, Vesely defines the present cultural situation as divided and ambiguous, especially when it comes to architecture (pp. 4–12, 36, 44 ss). Twentieth-century architecture, he argues, places its trust in the epistemological model of modern science and technology that is today largely reflected in instrumental concepts of city and suburban landscape. Today, he states, the attempt to rehabilitate the primary tradition of architecture faces the problem of bridging the gap between different modes of representation and concepts of knowledge that in some cases precede modern science, i.e., precede the historical notion of scientific knowledge as it takes course from the seventeenth- and sixteenth centuries.

Vesely's research delved into these historical settings that are understood to be the birthplace of modern science, in the general hope of exposing the origin of our modern notion of knowledge and how it came about to emancipate from traditional representations of the world. Vesely's research was accordingly a working out the historical notion of representation, as it constituted a central issue in this historical affair; and how the construction of a modern notion of knowledge had much to do with a changing nature in the concept of representation (pp. 13–19). The concept as it is generally understood today largely surpasses the history of epistemology. According to Vesely, this is because representation is generally understood on the basis of a certain "continuity between a particular mode of representation and what is represented" (p. 14), a notion which has been current throughout the whole of European architectural history.

=== The modern situation ===
When looking at the modern situation, Vesely finds that the problem is generally structured on the basis of an ontological difference that is intrinsic to representation itself. This is precisely the difference that allows modes of representation to emancipate from that which is represented, and from particular, given circumstances (pp. 4–5). The discussion of ontological difference therefore constitutes an epistemological difference affecting the conditions and possibilities of knowledge. And speculative thought, which we so associate with modern science, is built on this difference. Charles Taylor (1995) points out how the question for modern science is to fit a particular mode of representation to another, extrinsic representation: what we commonly call the "outer reality". The difference between the two constantly jeopardizes their epistemological value; and affects not only the way in which representation relates to what it means to represent, but also between different modes of representing it.

In response, Vesely's work explores how architecture constantly works between different modes of representation, through the difference between project and what is built, for instance, when it translates a whole city into a diagram, a plan or a map. The simple act of reading a map involves more than just the imagination to relate the map with the buildings and the surrounding space; it involves the reciprocity between different levels of representation, that may intake discrepancy and lack of information. According to Vesely, this kind of discrepancy might be useful to understand the nature of the question; and may in fact become a means to understand what impairs the communication between different levels of representation, and conversely, what happens when such communication takes place.

Vesely also takes up the example of an experiment that, paradoxically perhaps, was carried out in the hey-day of logical empiricism. The experiment was carried out by Schilder, and involved a temporary inversion of the visual field (pp. 46ss), leaving other perceptual fields untouched. Schilder's experiment addressed the discontinuity between the visual and other fields of perception, and exposed the situated human body as a basic structure of spatial reference (pp. 48–49). Vesely investigates how the subjects of the experiment found that their bodies were the first instance they could rely on when trying to situate in a visual world that was not only upside down, but also turned from left to right; and when trying to perform simple gestures like picking up a book, or reading. Although the experience was difficult to endure, the inverted vision could be partially reconciled with the original body structure (p. 47).

According to Vesely, the ability to reconcile the acquired inverted vision with the situational structure of the human body, points out to a deeper problem when dealing with situation, which is related to our ability to become situated on provisional grounds, even when lacking a fundamental 'ground' of spatial or temporal reference. The example from inverted vision also means to show that such a basis is far from being immediate; it is constituted in the process of a search within the actual space and comes about in the reciprocity between different levels and forms of representation such as visual, tactile, and so forth. Vesely elaborates on situation and the phenomenon of being situated as an example of how we contextualize spatial knowledge and on which basis; and on how a particular point of reference allows us to situate spatial knowledge. In the course of the argument, Vesely demonstrates that what constitutes the fabric of situation is a continuity of reference and experience through different forms of articulating spatiality down to an implicit structure that itself is neither visual nor tactile, and is only potentially articulated in the objective realm (pp. 48, 82–87, 378ss).

=== Situation and perception ===
Vesely's argument on the epistemological process of being situated develops in terms of an analogy to the formation of the visual field. And takes the organic ability of sight only as a point of departure to the phenomenon of vision, i.e. what one is able to recognize and know out of visual perception. Accordingly, the natural process of seeing is shown to be a result from learning. Vesely presents the example of inborn conditions of blindness treated through surgery, where sight itself only emerges after a painful stage of learning, and without which, the recently acquired sense of sight would be unable to detach or recognize individual objects out of a 'visual field' (pp. 50–51). Vesely describes how the integration of the newly acquired sense relies on the fact that the world of the blind is already structured, not only in terms of temporal sequences, but spatially; and that the reconciliation of the new ability of sight takes place on an already structured ground of existing objects and spatiality. Perception such as visual or tactile is reconciled upon an implicitly structured ground.

Vesely shows how the task of bridging different plateaux of representation can only be fulfilled by covering the distance to a common 'ground' (pp. 61–63). 'Ground' is like a point of departure from which it would become possible to uncover the basic structure of spatiality; but it is hardly the case that such an epistemological ground can provide us with an absolute source of spatial reference. The notion of epistemological ground is not established a priori, as a given point of reference. It comes about in the process of searching, taking place as a continuum of references between different levels of spatial understanding. In which case, what constitutes the structural source of situation is this stream of references (p. 60).

Vesely's notion of ground consists of a primary source of reference that in many ways coincides with the traditional Greek understanding of arché. Arché is not an absolute source of reference, but only a primary one that works as a point of departure towards our notion of "earth" and our understanding of "world" (pp. 50–52). This is an insecure ground that in a sense, speaks more of its own topography, than of clearly defined rules and references. Although this is an unfamiliar ground for modern science, Vesely accurately describes how much of the understanding of what it means to be situated derives from the knowledge of daily situations on Earth, where horizon and gravity play a common role. Accordingly, architecture's task of raising and 'building' situations does not address the mere existence of conditions such as floor or gravity, but concerns the fundamental condition of 'ground' allowing the phenomenon of situation to take place.

=== Situation and knowledge ===
On the epistemological level, this means that for Vesely, the nature of 'ground' allows an understanding of 'spatial structure'; like a hermeneutical key granting access to phenomena of spatiality. Contemporary architecture has been particularly keen on challenging the average views on ground viz. gravity. Although most architecture cannot escape the 'predicament' of gravity, there are numerous examples of play with gravity and the 'visual weight' of architectural mass against gravity, starting from the early twentieth-century constructivism. Such architectural play shows an impulse towards the emancipation from gravity as a natural source of situation, and looks forward to expose a more fundamental ground of reference and its problematic nature. Architecture is thus setting a clear challenge on everyday experience as they are structured characteristically in terms of up and down, and according to a horizontal ground. The experiment of the 'inverted vision' seems to show exactly that: the touch of ground helps to define the vertical and the relative distances of objects, orientation, and to recognize the physiognomy of the space. Outside these conditions it seems more or less obvious that the 'grounds' for situation escape our grasp. At the same time, architects are conscious that it is precisely the implicit nature of ground as a structure of references that makes the task of its architectural exploration so difficult.

Moreover, according to Vesely, the notion of 'ground' can never provide us with an absolute knowledge of the whole, but only with a mediated understanding of spatial structure. This means that the task of uncovering the hidden nature of ground becomes, a fortiori, one of looking for a provisional ground that is beyond gravity as a natural source of spatial reference. The first long-term programme dealing with the consequences of the absence of gravity was developed already in 1973 by the NASA Skylab. Vesely reports how one of the greatest difficulties encountered by the astronauts is the constant loss of orientation that becomes a general difficulty in recognizing previously known situations. Without gravity, an otherwise familiar compartment would be unrecognizable if not seen from a particular angle. The Sky Lab experience seems to illustrate quite well how the phenomenon of spatial structure and situation comes to be known through a sequence of approximations. Without the right orientation, simple recognition such as finding objects in their right places would become an almost impossible task. Once found the right orientation towards objects, however, the entire spatial frame of the compartment was recognized and so would all objects in their right places and relative positions. In a situation without light or gravity, one of the Sky Lab astronauts also described how a single touch on one of the walls of the space compartment would be sufficient to enact the knowledge of the relative position of the body with respect to all objects (pp. 52–54). This seems to be particularly relevant to show how a particular point of visual or tactile reference can provide with orientation; a physiognomic recognition of the space; and be related to the spatial disposition of the whole. These are instances that, according to Vesely, constitute a continuity of spatial reference and an epistemological, provisional ground. As it arises in the continuity of understanding the potential structure of the space, the notion of ground seems to be of a projective nature (p. 103).

=== The continuity of reference ===
Vesely seems to confer a projective ability on spatiality that is thus knowable from its own potential to generate a situation. According to Vesely, the continuity of reference to ground exists within a permanent tension with the actual space, a continuity which under certain conditions may be disrupted and even destroyed (pp. 55–56). The fact that there are discrepancies between different levels of representation should perhaps be no surprise as it is the case of the above-mentioned examples of reading a map, or orienting oneself in a space under zero gravity. That there is discrepancy between the given representation of a space and the actual space is in fact a common datum of everyday experience. The question is not to be solved, although it may constitute one important point of departure to understand the phenomenon of representation. This is particularly the case of extreme conditions where the phenomenon of 'continuity' is no longer recognizable. In the cases of aphasia and apraxia, which rank among others of what is generally known as mental blindness, there is a blatant discontinuity between the possibilities of notional understanding and the actual performance of a purposive act or standard articulation of speech. The work and research that has been carried out on mental blindness tends to show that the ability to articulate both speech and purposive actions and gestures is nonetheless affected by the surrounding environment, and is not based upon mental impairment alone. On the contrary, it has become increasingly clear that such conditions do not take place solely as a result of mental functions; neither can they be enacted by the situational structure, as both contribute to the failure and success of treatment (p. 57).

Vesely brings the argument about these conditions back to the experiments regarding orientation, such as the inverted vision experiment and orientation under zero gravity conditions, and correlates it with the problems experienced with mental blindness. This is because of the fundamental knowledge of spatiality that is at stake that enables a possible representation to be actually effected. As regards spatiality, Vesely presupposes an existing continuity between the possible and the actual spatial configuration, as a mediated structure (p. 58). This understanding of representation seems to reverberate Husserl's phenomenological treatment of representation, as moving from the horizon of vague, informal representation (Vorstellung), through a number of possibilities (Vergegenwärtigungen), until it finally reaches actuality (Repräsentation). The fact that Husserl only used the word Repräsentation to deal with explicit forms of representation, may serve us as an example of how a whole representational process was being kept in the background. Husserl's process of representation shows that our knowledge of spatiality intakes different levels of articulation, which are not always as clearly defined as we would wish. This means that the ground and point of departure of explicit references is not a point of departure towards a growing, cumulative knowledge of situation, but is rather a 'coming back' into a prereflective world of experience. In this sense, representation takes place as a spectrum ranging out of explicit forms of articulation into an implicit background, a concept that seems to be confirmed by later phenomenology of perception. It seems obvious that, because of the nature of this prereflective ground, verbal or visual articulation of it cannot take place in an explicit sense. On the contrary, the phenomenological gaze at this background takes place indirectly (p. 69) as a preunderstanding of the world. If this is so, then not only our epistemological ground is constituted as an identity of interpretation of different levels of perception, but also the concept of representation as such is constituted as a movement out of a prereflective background. This is precisely the background against which it becomes possible for an articulated structure to take place and be identified as such (pp. 75–77). This also means that the difference between different levels of articulation, namely between a preunderstanding background and a given object is precisely what allows us to see the object and situate it within our world of experience. If we accept Vesely's argument, then the difference that formerly stood as an epistemological barrier now becomes a necessary condition for representation to take place.

=== The latent world of architecture ===
Vesely addresses the preunderstanding of world as a latent world (p. 83), that is potentially articulated and structured, and whose relationship to its visible manifestation is not immediate. The reciprocity between this prearticulated level and its visible articulation dwells within the very ontological difference that has been discussed previously. Such reciprocity is a schematic constituent of phenomena of continuity and metaphoricity, that have been constantly described throughout the primary tradition of Christian humanism in the nature of being and becoming. Vesely thus enters the core of the question of representation in terms of its coming into the level of visibility. In the sequence of Vesely's argument, the subject of visibility becomes then, of itself, problematic in nature as it intakes a background of potential articulation.

According to Vesely, "the horizon of visibility displays a synthesis of the prereflective experience and of the achievements of reflection insofar as they preserve ontological continuity with the visible" (p. 85). On the other hand, the rise onto the explicit level of visibility primarily seems to express the problem of representation in terms of what is kept from the prereflective world. This could perhaps be seen as a consequence of the traditional concept of inner representation as relating to an external reality. Vesely challenges this concept of representation, and widens it as a spectrum that ranges from the explicitness of our world down to implicit levels of articulation. Consequently, the term reality is restricted mostly to certain types of representation (e.g. virtual reality) that view reality as something extrinsic (pp. 308–315).

Vesely's concept of representation, however, takes place in terms of a communication between a wide range of levels; whereby the question that concerns representation also concerns the truth of representation, a question that has been amply developed by modern hermeneutics. In this domain, the visible world conveys a kind of knowledge of the prereflective levels of articulation that also jeopardizes the epistemological status of the visible. As we have seen, contrary to empiricist belief, the visible world by itself does not constitute an epistemological ground (pp. 84–86). Instead, our epistemological ground is constituted by features such as orientation, physiognomy, and the relative position of things with regard to one another; and it is from these features that a provisional ground comes to be constituted as regards spatiality. This ground is not a still point of reference. On the contrary, by ground is here meant a source and stream of references. This means that the explicit horizon of the visible, tangible world is the most explicit form of embodiment we have, but such a narrow horizon we can only take as a point of departure if we want to understand the rest of our world that is largely beyond visibility. This also means that the visible holds a very important part as a symbolic representation of our world, enabling us to see and imagine beyond the visible.

Finally, this means that we construe our knowledge of 'world' largely on the basis of invisible, implicit references which are only symbolically re-enacted by the visible realm. The level of visual representation may perhaps be compared to the level of more explicit verbal articulation as regards the implicit, preverbal domain of knowledge. Just as visual representation, verbal articulation has the power to emancipate from the given world, and the freedom to convey any meaning. This is a power bestowed upon representation, allowing it to withdraw from its original symbolic domain, thus establishing a tension between the instrumental nature of representation and its larger symbolic field.

== Bibliography ==
- 'Surrealism, Myth and Modernity' In: Architectural Design: 2–3 (Surrealism and Architecture) London: AD Profiles 11 (1978), pp. 87–95.
- 'Introduction' In: Eric Parry Architects, Volume 1 (London: Black Dog, 2002). ISBN 1-906-15562-3
- The Architectonics of Embodiment In: Body and Building (MIT Press, 2002). ISBN 0-262-54183-1
- Space, Simulation and Disembodiment in Contemporary Architecture In: Architecture and Phenomenology (Eindhoven, 2002).
- Architecture in the Age of Divided Representation: The Question of Creativity in the Shadow of Production (MIT Press, 2004). ISBN 0-262-22067-9
- The Latent World of Architecture In: Space-Place, Symposium on Phenomenology and Architecture (HK Heritage Museum, 2005).
- 'Introduction' In: Eric Parry Architects, Volume 2 (London: Black Dog, 2011). ISBN 1-906-15525-9

== See also ==
- Marco Frascari
- Daniel Libeskind
- Alberto Pérez-Gómez
- Joseph Rykwert
- Nader El-Bizri
- David Leatherbarrow
- Robert Tavernor
- Eric Parry
