= Alberto Pérez-Gómez =

Mexican architectural historian living in Canada

Alberto Pérez-Gómez OC (born 24 December 1949) is an architectural historian and theorist known for taking a phenomenological approach to architecture. He lives in Montreal.

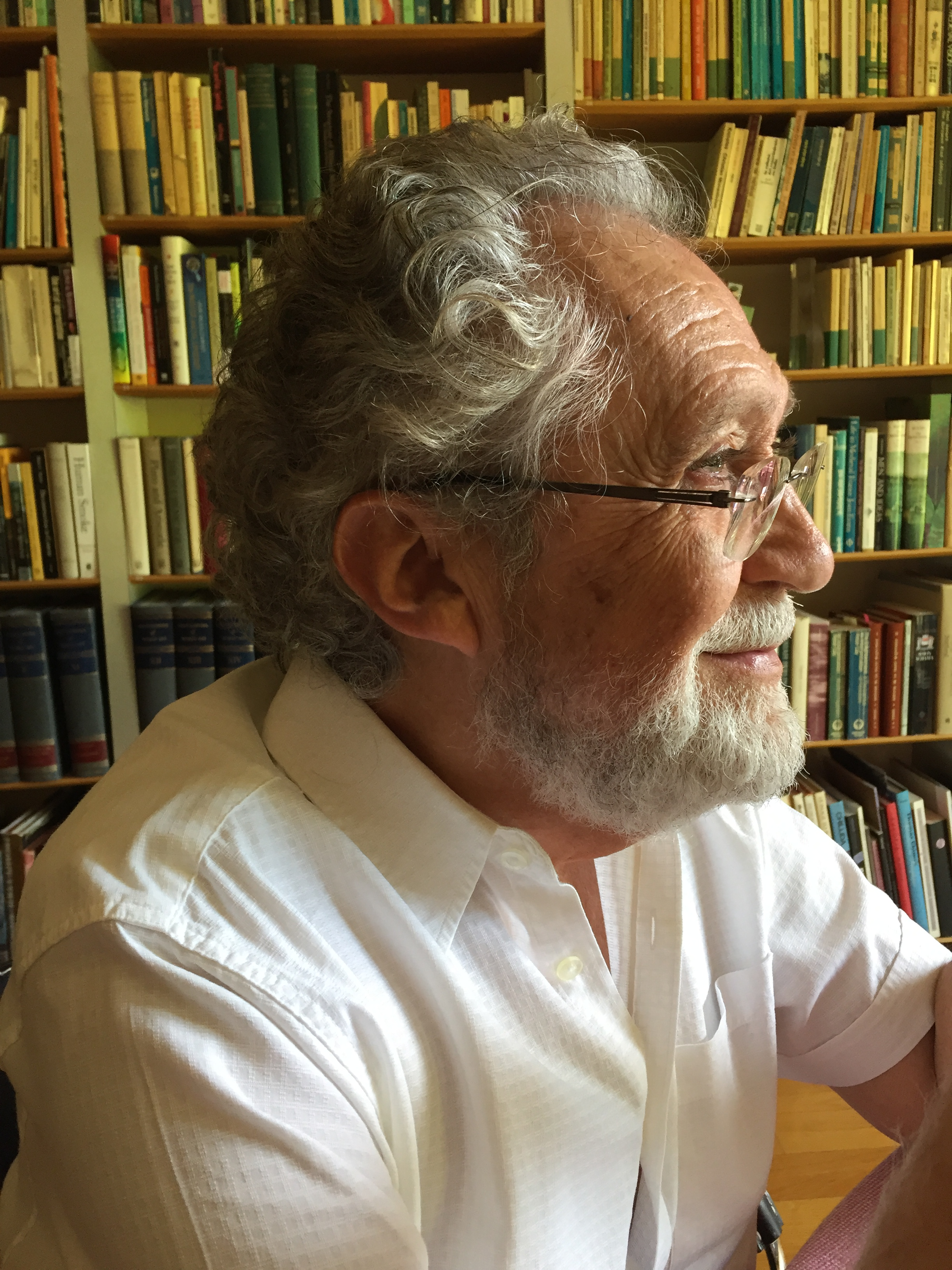

== Biography ==
Born December 24, 1949, in Mexico City he graduated as an engineer and architect from the National Polytechnic Institute of Mexico. Afterwards he did postgraduate work at Cornell University. He then pursued graduate studies in the History and Theory of Architecture at the University of Essex where he received his Master of Arts in 1975 and Ph.D. in 1979. In 1987 he became a Canadian Citizen and a Quebec resident. In 1984, he won the Alice Davis Hitchcock Award for his book Architecture and the Crisis of Modern Science. He has taught and lectured at various schools of architecture around the world and was director of the Carleton University School of Architecture from 1983 to 1986. From 1986 to 2020, he ran the History and Theory of Architecture program at the McGill University School of Architecture, where he was the Saidye Rosner Bronfman Professor in History and Theory of Architecture. He is currently the Saidye Rosner Bronfman Professor Emeritus of Architecture. In 2022, he was appointed Officer of the Order of Canada.

Dr. Pérez-Gómez is the author of numerous volumes of architectural scholarship. Polyphilo or The Dark Forest Revisited (MIT Press, 1992), an erotic narrative/theory of architecture that retells the love story of the famous fifteenth century novel/treatise Hypnerotomachia Poliphili in late twentieth-century terms, a text that has become the source of numerous projects and exhibitions (http://www.polyphilo.com). A Spanish version translated by the author was published as El Sueño de Polyfilo. El Origen Erótico del Significado Arquitectónico (Universidad Iberoamericana, 2012). He was co-editor of the well-known book series CHORA: Intervals in the Philosophy of Architecture vol. 1-7 (McGill-Queen's University Press) together with Stephen Parcell, which collects essays exploring fundamental questions concerning the practice of architecture through its history and theories. He co-authored a major book with Louise Pelletier, Architectural Representation and the Perspective Hinge (MIT Press, 1997), tracing the history and theory of modern European architectural representation, with special reference to the role of projection in architectural design. In Built Upon Love: Architectural Longing after Ethics and Aesthetics (MIT Press, 2006), Pérez-Gómez examines points of convergence between ethics and poetics in architectural history and philosophy, and draws important conclusions for contemporary practice. His most recent title, Attunement, Architectural Meaning after the Crisis of Modern Science (MIT Press, 2016) calls for an architecture that can enhance our human values and capacities, an architecture that is connected—attuned—to its location and its inhabitants. Architecture, Pérez-Gómez explains, operates as a communicative setting for societies; its beauty and its meaning lie in its connection to human health and self-understanding.

== Publications ==
- Attunement: Architectural Meaning after the Crisis of Modern Science (2016) ISBN 0-262-52864-9
- Timely Meditations: Architectural Theories and Practices (Selected Essays on Architecture), vol.1 (2016) ISBN 1-533-00350-5
- Timely Meditations: Architectural Philosophy and Hermeneutics (Selected Essays on Architecture), vol.2 (2016) ISBN 1-534-69535-4
- Built upon Love: Architectural Longing after Ethics and Aesthetics (2006) ISBN 0-262-16238-5
- Architectural Representation and the Perspective Hinge with Louise Pelletier (2003) ISBN 0-262-16169-9
- Anamorphosis (1997) ISBN 0-7735-1450-3
- Polyphilo, or, The Dark Forest Revisited : an Erotic Epiphany of Architecture (1992) ISBN 0-262-66090-3
- Architecture and the Crisis of Modern Science (1983) ISBN 0-262-16091-9
- Lo Bello y lo Justo en Arquitectura (2015) ISBN 978-607-502-348-9
- Alberto Pérez-Gómez. De la Educación en Arquitectura (2014) ISBN 978-607-417-278-2
- El Sueño de Polyfilo. El Origen Erótico del Significado Arquitectónico (2012) ISBN 978-607-417-190-7

== Awards and recognitions ==
- Officer of the Order of Canada (2022)
- Profesor Honoris Causa, International Institute of Hermeneutics (2021)
- Award for Outstanding Achievement, Architecture, Culture, and Spirituality Forum (2021)
- Droga Architect in Residence Fellowship Sydney Australia (2017)
- David Thomson Award for Excellence in Graduate Supervision and Teaching McGill University (2008)
- Canadian Personalities Exchange Programme Award Israel Association of Canadian Studies, The Hebrew University of Jerusalem, Israel, (2007)
- Fellowship from the Institute of Arts and Humanities of the Pennsylvania State University (2007)
- Juan O’Gorman Medal (1999) For 25 years of distinguished service in Architectural Education, IPN, Mexico
- Alice Davies Hitchcock Book Award (1983) Granted by the Society of Architectural Historians for Architecture and the Crisis of Modern Science as "the most distinguished work of scholarship in the history of architecture published in North America between Nov. 1, 1981 to Oct. 31, 1983."
- Fellow of the Mexican Academy of Architecture (1980)

== See also ==
- Hypnerotomachia Poliphili
- Marco Frascari
- Gregory Henriquez
- Joseph Rykwert
- Dalibor Vesely
- Nader El-Bizri
- David Leatherbarrow
- Robert Tavernor
- Louise Pelletier
- Lily Chi
- Marc J. Neveu
- Lisa Landrum
- Peter Olshavsky
- Jason Crow
- Architecture theory
- McGill University School of Architecture
- Stylianos Giamarelos (2015) Interdisciplinary Deflections: Histories of the Scientific Revolution in Alberto Pérez-Gómez's Architecture and the Crisis of Modern Science. Journal of Architectural Education Vol. 69, Iss. 1, http://www.tandfonline.com/doi/full/10.1080/10464883.2015.987069
