= Robert Tavernor =

English Emeritus Professor of Architecture and Urban Design

Robert Tavernor (born 1954) is an English Emeritus Professor of Architecture and Urban Design at the London School of Economics and Political Science (LSE), and founding director of the Tavernor Consultancy in London. He is an architecture historian and urbanist, who has published widely on architecture and urban design, including the impact of tall buildings on historic cities. His academic career includes being appointed to the Forbes Chair in Architecture at the University of Edinburgh at age 36.

== Biography ==
Tavernor was born in England and studied architecture in London (B.A. and Dip. Arch with Distinction, 1973–79), Rome (British Prix de Rome in Architecture at the British School at Rome, 1979–80), and at the University of Cambridge (St John's College, 1980–83, doctorate awarded 1985), where his PhD thesis, Concinnitas in the Architectural Theory and Practice of Leon Battista Alberti, was supervised by Joseph Rykwert. He is a registered architect and a member of the Royal Institute of British Architects (since 1985).

Tavernor has held multiple academic posts in the UK. He was formerly Forbes Professor of Architecture at the University of Edinburgh (1992–95), professor of architecture and head of the department of architecture and civil engineering at the University of Bath (1995–2005), LSE professor of architecture and urban design (2005–2011) and director of the LSE Cities Programme (2005–08). He held various visiting academic posts internationally, including visiting professor at the University of California at Los Angeles (UCLA, 1998), European Union visiting scholar in planning and conservation at the University of Texas A&M (2002); and visiting professor in architecture and urbanism at the University of São Paulo, Brazil (2004), and the University of Bath (since 2009).

He founded the Centre for Advanced Studies in Architecture (CASA) at Bath, and with Vaughan Hart, established a focus on Classical and Italian Renaissance architectural treatises; between them they have translated and written about leading classical architectural theorists. He has been a national assessor for the Architecture and the Built Environment sub-panel of the 2008 Research Assessment Exercise (RAE2008) for the UK Higher Education Funding Council for Education (HEFCE), and a member of the Faculty of the Fine Arts of the British School at Rome.

Tavernor initiated (with co-authors) a series of modern translations of some of the principal classical architectural treatise writers – notably Vitruvius, Alberti and Palladio – and is the sole author of parallel monographs on these subjects published by (Yale and MIT). His book on Alberti was described as "the last and the best of the books on Alberti on this scale in the twentieth century" (Chronique). He pioneered the use of the computer to visualize urban forms in architectural exhibitions, co-curating with Rykwert in 1994 the international exhibition of Alberti's work at Palazzo Te in Mantua for the computer firm Olivetti. As a consultant architect and urbanist he applies his knowledge of architectural history, design and the visual representation of buildings in advising planners and architects on the form, character, scale and massing of tall buildings in the City of London and along the south bank of the Thames. His advice on several large urban masterplan projects in London (including Battersea Power Station) led to him being invited in 2007, by former Russian Senator Gordeev, to assemble and to contribute his expertise to an international master planning team to re-configure the city of Perm (population of 1 million) in the southern Urals. The published masterplan led by KCAP was awarded the Grand Prix at the Moscow Architecture Biennale in May 2010.

Robert Tavernor currently works as an architectural and urban design consultant in London.

== Works ==
As an architectural historian and theorist, Tavernor is an expert in the foundations of Italian Renaissance architecture and the transmission of associated ideas and forms to England and America. He is the author of Palladio and Palladianism (1991 – subsequently translated into Italian, Chinese, and Korean) and On Alberti and the Art of Building (1998). He is co-translator of two English translations of architectural treatises: Leon Battista Alberti's 16th century De re aedificatoria, as On the Art of Building in Ten Books (1988); and Andrea Palladio's 17th century I Quattro Libri dell Architettura, as The Four Books on Architecture (1997), and co-edited and provided the introduction to Vitruvius' On Architecture (2009).

Tavernor's translation works have become standard texts in art historical scholarship, used by students and scholars throughout the world. His book Smoot’s Ear: The Measure of Humanity (2007 and 2008) pulls together much of his earlier writings and sets measures and measuring in a cultural context and shows how deeply they are connected to human experience and history. Other notable architects have used his writing as inspiration.

Tavernor was co-editor of Body and Building: Essays on the changing relation of Body to Architecture (2002 and 2005), a collection of essays on art and architecture dedicated to Rykwert. He founded the Alberti Group with Rykwert, which led to the 1994 international exhibition on Alberti for Olivetti. Photogrammetric drawings relating to research for the exhibition can be found on the CASA website at Bath University. Tavernor was subsequently commissioned by the Royal Academy of Arts to produce computer-animated urban and architectural reconstructions through CASA for exhibitions in London and internationally, for the Sir John Soane Exhibition (1999), Aztecs Exhibition (2003), and by Tate Britain for the Sir Stanley Spencer Exhibition (2001).

== Publications (selection) ==
- On the Art of Building in Ten Books translated by Joseph Rykwert, Robert Tavernor and Neil Leach (The MIT Press, 1988) ISBN 0-262-51060-X, ISBN 978-0-262-51060-8
- Palladio and Palladianism (Thames & Hudson, 1991) ISBN 0-500-20242-7, ISBN 978-0-500-20242-5
- Edinburgh (in Rassegna, 1996: separate English and Italian editions) ISBN 88-85322-22-0, ISBN 978-88-85322-22-6
- The Four Books on Architecture translated by Robert Tavernor and Richard Schofield (The MIT Press, 1997) ISBN 0-262-16162-1, ISBN 978-0-262-16162-6
- On Alberti and the Art of Building (Yale University Press, 1998) ISBN 0-300-07615-0, ISBN 978-0-300-07615-8
- Body and Building: Essays on the changing relation of Body to Architecture edited by George Dodds and Robert Tavernor (The MIT Press, 2002; paperback edition 2005) ISBN 0-262-04195-2, ISBN 978-0-262-04195-9, ISBN 0-262-54183-1, ISBN 978-0-262-54183-1
- Smoot’s Ear: the Measure of Humanity (Yale University Press, 2007; paperback edition 2008) ISBN 978-0-300-12492-7, ISBN 0-300-12492-9
- Vitruvius, On Architecture Introduction by Robert Tavernor, translated by Richard Schofield (Penguin Classics, 2009) ISBN 978-0-14-144168-9, ISBN 0-14-144168-2

== See also ==
- Joseph Rykwert
- Oliver R. Smoot
- Vaughan Hart
- Dalibor Vesely
- Nader El-Bizri
- Alberto Perez-Gomez
