= Oslo School of Architecture and Design =

Architecture school in Oslo, Norway

- Arkitektur- og designhøgskolen i Oslo (AHO)
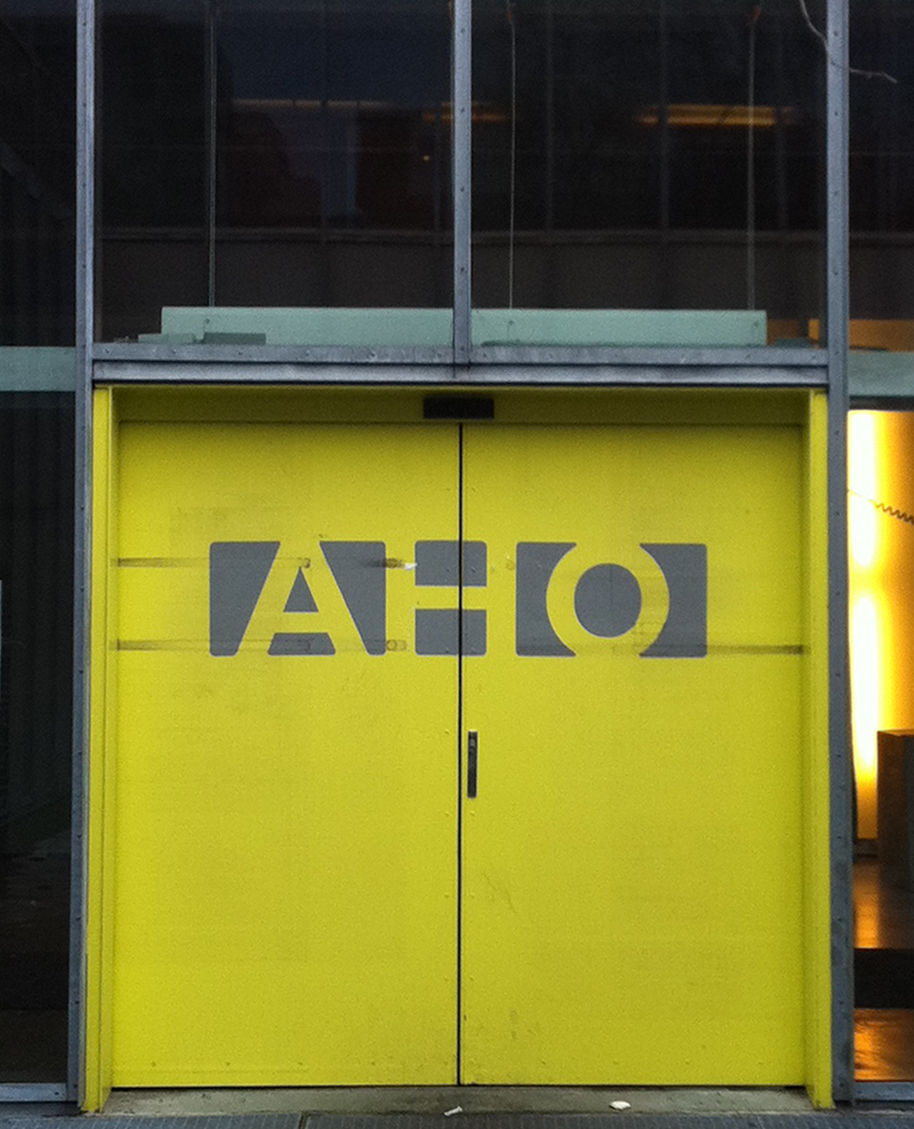
- Former names: The Norwegian Arts and Crafts School, Architectural course, Oslo School of Architecture
- Motto: "Benign, lest ye risk being eight." (Rough Norwegian translation)
- Type: Public university college
- Established: 1945; 81 years ago
- Rector: Ole Gustavsen (2018–2022)
- Administrative staff: 100
- Students: 650
- Doctoral students: 50
- Location: Oslo, Norway; 59°55′27.79″N 10°45′5.13″E
- Campus: Urban
- Website: aho.no/english/

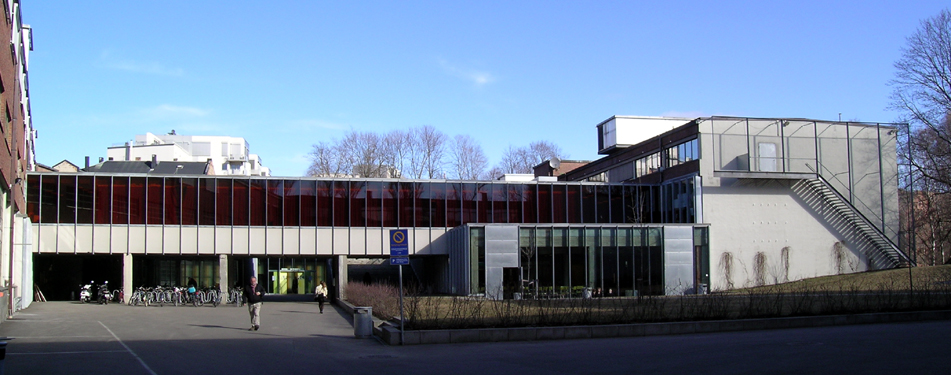
AHO Oslo

The Oslo School of Architecture and Design (Norwegian: Arkitektur- og designhøgskolen i Oslo, AHO) is an autonomous institution within the Norwegian university system. The School offers education in the fields of architecture, urbanism, design, and landscape architecture.

AHO offers three full-time master's programmes: Master of Architecture, Master of Design and Master of Landscape Architecture – the last programme is offered in Oslo and at the Arctic University in Tromsø. The school also offers post-professional Master's courses in Urbanism and Architectural Conservation. AHO offers a single type of doctoral degree, the Doctor of Philosophy.

== History ==
The school was established directly after World War II as a "crisis course" for students of architecture who were unable to finish their degree due to the outbreak of the war. Before this, the only Norwegian option for obtaining an architectural degree was at Norwegian Institute of Technology (NTH) in Trondheim.

All through the first half of the twentieth century, a group of architects had worked hard towards the establishment of an architectural school that was more aesthetically and academically oriented than a polytechnic education. The school was ultimately situated in Oslo, since it was generally felt that the capital had access to many of the nation's best practicing architects.

Initially, the architectural course was part of the Norwegian National Academy of Craft and Art Industry. In 1961 The Oslo School of Architecture was established as an independent school, and, from 1968, located in St. Olavs gate.

In 1979, the first formal education in industrial design in Norway was offered as a two-year postgraduate study. A full degree program was established in 1983, and in 1989 this was placed under the direction of The Norwegian Arts and Crafts School. Then, in 1996, the Institute of Industrial Design became part of the Oslo School of Architecture.

Master of Landscape Architecture became part of AHO's master's programmes in 2004. In 2005, The Oslo School of Architecture changed name to The Oslo School of Architecture and Design. In 2009, the Institute of Industrial Design changed its name to the Institute of Design.

In 2001, the school moved to new facilities at Vulkan, a revitalised industrial area near the Aker River, a central, creative and cultural part of the city. The school lays adjacent to the Oslo National Academy of the Arts and the recently opened food hall Mathallen Oslo. In 2005, the school updated its name to The Oslo School of Architecture and Design.

== Units ==
- Institute of Architecture
- Institute of Design
- Institute of Form, Theory and History
- Institute of Urbanism and Landscape

== Notable persons ==
=== Faculty ===
- Laura Cristea (* 198?), architect and scientific associate
- Angela Deuber (* 1975), architect and visiting professor
- Sverre Fehn (1924–2009), architect and retired university professor
- Pascal Flammer (* 1973), architect and visiting professor
- Giulia Furlan (* 1985), architect and visiting professor
- Kersten Geers (* 1975), architect and university professor
- Romina Grillo (* 1984), architect and lecturer
- Neven Fuchs (* 1947), architect and retired university professor
- Harry Gugger (* 1956), architect and retired university professor
- Christian Kerez (* 1962), architect and university professor
- Raphael Zuber (* 1973), architect and visiting professor

=== Alumni ===
- Logi Már Einarsson, Member of the Parliament of Iceland
- Hanna Geiran, Norway's 9th Director General of the Directorate for Cultural Heritage
- Monika Hestad, industrial designer and researcher
- Erling Dokk Holm, journalist
- Carl-Viggo Hølmebakk
- Guðmundur Jónsson, architect
- Christian Norberg-Schulz, architect
- Lotte Sandberg, art historian and journalist
- Eveliina Sarapää, architect and footballer
- Jan Olav Jensen and Børre Skodvin, architects
- Thomas Thiis-Evensen, architect
- Sverre Wyller, post-war artist

== Experimental building ==
- 2014–2016: Inverted House, Hokkaidō by Raphael Zuber, Neven Fuchs and Laura Cristea with Kengo Kuma and Associates
