= Christian Norberg-Schulz =

Norwegian architect and educator (1926–2000)

Christian Norberg-Schulz (23 May 1926 – 28 March 2000) was a Norwegian architect, author, educator and architectural theorist. Norberg-Schulz was part of the Modernist Movement in architecture and associated with architectural phenomenology.

== Biography ==
Thorvald Christian Norberg-Schulz was born in Oslo, Norway. He was educated at the Eidgenossische Technische Hochschule in Zurich in 1949 with subsequent studies in Rome. He studied at Harvard University under a Fulbright scholarship. Between 1963 and 1978 he edited Byggekunst, an official magazine of National Association of Norwegian Architects. He received his Doctor of Technology in architecture from the Norwegian Institute of Technology in 1964 and became a professor at Yale University, the following year. Norberg-Schulz was a professor and later Dean at the Oslo School of Architecture and Design from 1966 to 1992. During 1974, he was a visiting professor at the Massachusetts Institute of Technology Architecture Department.

In the 1950s and 1960s, Norberg-Schulz practiced as an architect both alone and in collaboration with Arne Korsmo, with whom he co-designed the famous row houses at Planetveien Street in Oslo, where both of them lived with their respective families. Norberg-Schulz became progressively disillusioned with practice, just as his first book, "Intentions in Architecture", started to earn him international acclaim as an architectural theorist. His later theoretical work of the 1970s and 1980s moved from the analytical and psychological concerns of his earlier writings to the phenomenology of place, and he was one of the first architectural theorists to bring Martin Heidegger to the field. Nevertheless, his interpretation of Heidegger's phenomenology has been often criticized. His book Genius Loci: Towards a Phenomenology of Architecture (1979) was widely influential in Europe and the Americas. He is recognized as a central figure in the architectural phenomenology movement. He is also well known internationally both for his books on architectural history (in particular Italian classical architecture, especially the Baroque) and for his writings on theory.

== Personal life ==
In 1955, he married Anna Maria de Dominicis. They had three children; two sons Erik (1955) Christian Emanuel (1967) and one daughter Elizabeth (1959).

== In popular culture ==
- Mark Z. Danielewski quotes Norberg-Schulz on page 74 of his novel House of Leaves, and then again on pages 170–71 (in the second edition).
- The Onion, a fictional and satirical "newspaper", has featured Ask the Concept of Phenomenology in Architecture as developed by Christian Norberg-Schulz, a parody of an advice column.

== Books in English ==
- Intentions in Architecture MIT Press, Cambridge, Mass., 1965.
- Existence, Space and Architecture Praeger Publishers, London, 1971
- Meaning in Western Architecture Rizzoli, New York, 1974.
- Baroque Architecture Rizzoli, Milan, 1979.
- Late Baroque and Rococo Architecture Rizzoli, Milan, 1980.
- Genius Loci, Towards a Phenomenology of Architecture Rizzoli, New York. 1980.
- Modern Norwegian Architecture Scandinavian University Press, Oslo, 1987.
- New World Architecture Princeton Architectural Press, New York, 1988.
- Concept of Dwelling Rizzoli, New York. 1993.
- Nightlands. Nordic Building, MIT Press, Cambridge, Mass., 1997.
- Principles of Modern Architecture Andreas Papadakis Publishers, London, 2000.
- Architecture: Presence, Language, Place Skira, Milan, 2000.

== Primary source ==
- An Eye for Place: Christian Norberg-Schulz: Architect, Historian and Editor (Gro Lauvland, author. Gyldendal Akademisk, Oslo. 2009) ISBN 9788281520325
