= Monika Hestad =

Norwegian industrial designer and researcher

- Born: March 8, 1977 (age 48); Ulsteinvik, Norway
- Education: Philosophiæ doctor in Industrial design
- Alma mater: Oslo School of Architecture and Design
- Occupation: Industrial designer

Monika Hestad (born 8 March 1977) is a Norwegian industrial designer and researcher.

Hestad was educated at the Oslo School of Architecture and Design and received a Master of Industrial Design degree (sivilindustridesigner) in 2002. She was awarded a doctorate (Ph.D.) from the same institution in 2008. Hestad has practiced as an industrial designer and consultant since 2001.

Hestad's research has examined the interaction between industrial design and brand building. These fields have in the past been the domain of industrial designers and marketing professionals respectively, and the interaction between them has been limited. Through her doctoral research and several articles Hestad developed models to illustrate the role of the product's form in the strengthening of a brand. The research has primarily been directed at the strategic level within theory and practice, and looked at what implications the brand context has for industrial designers' treatment of form. She has nevertheless also made findings that are relevant to industrial designers and companies on a tactical level. As part of her doctoral research Hestad also investigated how end user involvement in all stages of a product life cycle changes the assumptions of the design process. Her book Branding and Product Design: An integrated perspective (2013) provides a summary of her research and how her findings are relevant for designers, marketers and managers.

From 2002 to 2003 Hestad was part of a commission appointed by the Norwegian Government (Council of State) to suggest a new Higher Education Act for Norway. The commission, headed by Anders Chr. Stray Ryssdal, produced Official Norwegian Report NOU 2003:25 which led to the Parliament passing a new comprehensive Higher Education Act in 2005.

Hestad resides in London, where she leads the consultancy Brand Valley Design and a lectures at Central Saint Martins.

== Bibliography ==
- Hestad, Monika (2008). Den kommersielle formen : merkevarekonteksten som utfordring for industridesignernes behandling av form (PDF) (in Norwegian). Oslo: Oslo School of Architecture and Design. ISBN 978-82-547-0217-8. LCCN 2008476385. OCLC 476887255. OL 23179730M. Archived from the original (PDF) on 2011-07-24.
- Hestad, Monika (2013). Branding and Product Design: An integrated perspective. Farnham: Gower Publishing. ISBN 978-1-4094-4626-2. LCCN 2012033345. OCLC 816286071. Archived from the original on 2014-10-09.
- Hestad, Monika; Rigoni, Silvia (2013). The Little Booklet on Design Thinking: an Introductory Workshop. London: Brand Valley Publications. ISBN 978-0-9574958-0-7.
