= Neil Leach =

British architect and theorist

Neil Leach is a British architect and theorist. He is also a licensed architect, registered to practice in the United Kingdom.

== Education ==
Leach holds a Master of Arts degree and a Diploma of Architecture degree from the University of Cambridge, and a Doctor of Philosophy degree from the University of Nottingham.

== Academic history ==
He is professor at Florida International University, the European Graduate School and Tongji University. He has also taught at the Architectural Association School of Architecture, Harvard University, Columbia University, Cornell University, SCI-Arc, University of Southern California, University of Nottingham, University of Bath, University of Brighton, Dessau Institute of Architecture, Royal Danish Academy of Art, and Institute for Advanced Architecture of Catalonia. He is currently the Director of the Doctor of Design program at Florida International University. He is an academician within the Academy of Europe, and has also been a NASA Innovative Advanced Concepts Fellow. He is co-founder of DigitalFUTURES.

== Academic interests ==
Leach's initial research interests focused on the Italian Renaissance. His first publication was a translation from the Latin of de re aedificatoria, the fifteenth century treatise on architecture written by Italian humanist, Leon Battista Alberti. The translation was undertaken under the supervision of Joseph Rykwert.

Subsequently, his interests shifted into the realm of contemporary architectural theory, and he developed a particular interest in Continental Philosophy and its potential impact on architectural thinking. Leach's position in regards to architectural theory was first set out in the "cultural reader" he edited, Rethinking Architecture (1997). The book contained a selection of well-known writings about architecture written by thinkers within Continental Philosophy, ranging from Hermeneutics and Phenomenology to Structuralism and Deconstruction, prefaced by Leach's own introductions. Among the authors included were: Jacques Derrida, Martin Heidegger, Umberto Eco, Michel Foucault, Jean Baudrillard and Walter Benjamin. What the selection set out to represent was a rethinking of architectural practice; making it a critical activity, not simply accepting the given paradigm, while at the same time placing architecture within the realm of cultural studies. He subsequently published a series of edited volumes and monographs based on material from that book.

His work then developed in the direction of materialism and computation, inspired in part by the work of Gilles Deleuze and Manuel DeLanda but also by new scientific thinking. This informs his curatorial work and design teaching which engage extensively with scripting and digital fabrication. He is the co-recipient of two NASA grants to explore the potential use of the robotic fabrication technology, Contour Crafting, for building structures on the Moon and Mars.

Currently, he is working in the field of architecture and artificial intelligence, where he has published two books, Architecture in the Age of Artificial Intelligence: An Introduction to AI for Architects and Machine Hallucinations: Architecture and AI, and has contracts to publish three more. He also engages with the field of neuroscience.

== Activities in China ==
Leach has been involved extensively in China, where he directed the American Academy in China for several years. He was the co-curator (with Xu Weiguo) of the A2 Exhibition of Avant-Garde Architecture at the Architecture Biennial Beijing 2004, the Emerging Talents, Emerging Technologies Exhibition at the Architecture Biennial Beijing 2006, the (Im)material Processes Exhibition at the Architecture Biennial Beijing 2008, and the Machinic Processes Exhibition at the Architecture Biennial Beijing 2010. He was also the co-curator (with Roland Snooks) of the Swarm Intelligence: Architectures of Multi-Agent Systems Exhibition in Shanghai in 2010, and (with Philip Yuan) of the DigitalFUTURES Exhibition in Shanghai in 2011 (with Philip Yuan) of the Interactive Shanghai Exhibition in Shanghai in 2013, and (with Xu Weiguo) of the Design Intelligence: Advanced Computational Research Exhibition in Beijing in 2013, and the Digital Factory: Advanced Computational Research Exhibition in Shanghai in 2015. Since 2011 he has co-curated (with Philip Yuan) the annual DigitalFUTURES exhibitions in Shanghai. He currently holds a Professorship at Tongji University, where he is a PhD supervisor.

== Publications ==
- On the Art of Building in Ten Books with Joseph Rykwert (1988, 1991)
- Rethinking Architecture - editor (1997)
- Millennium Culture (1999)
- The Anaesthetics of Architecture (1999)
- Architecture and Revolution - editor (1999)
- Mars Pants with Oliver Froome-Lewis et al. (2000)
- Designing for a Digital World - editor (2002)
- The Hieroglyphics of Space - editor (2002)
- China (2004)
- Fast Forward>>, Hot Spots, Brain Cells - co-editor with Xu Weiguo (2004)
- Digital Tectonics - co-editor with David Turnbull and Chris Williams (2004)
- Emerging Talents, Emerging Technologies: Architects - co-editor with Xu Weiguo (2006)
- Emerging Talents, Emerging Technologies: Students - co-editor with Xu Weiguo (2006)
- Forget Heidegger (2006)
- Camouflage (2006)
- (Im)material Processes: Architects - co-editor with Xu Weiguo (2008)
- (Im)material Processes: Students - co-editor with Xu Weiguo (2008)
- Digital Cities - editor (2009)
- Machinic Processes: Architects - co-editor with Xu Weiguo (2010)
- Machinic Processes: Students - co-editor with Xu Weiguo (2010)
- Swarm Intelligence: Architectures of Multi-Agent Systems - co-editor with Roland Snooks (2017)
- Fabricating the Future - co-editor with Philip Yuan (2012)
- Scripting the Future - co-editor with Philip Yuan (2012)
- Digital Workshop in China - co-editor with Philip Yuan (2013)
- Design Intelligence: New Computational Research - co-editor with Xu Weiguo (2013)
- Space Architecture: The New Frontier for Design Research - editor (2014)
- Robotic Futures - co-editor with Philip Yuan and Achim Menges (2015)
- Digital Factory: New Computational Research - co-editor with Xu Weiguo (2015)
- Swarm Intelligence: Architectures of Multi-Agent Systems - co-editor with Roland Snooks (2017)
- 3D Printed Body Architecture - co-editor with Behnaz Farahi (2017)
- Computational Design - co-editor with Philip Yuan (2017)
- Digital Fabrication - co-editor with Achim Menges and Philip Yuan (2017)
- Architectural Intelligence - co-editor with Philip Yuan, Neil Leach, Mike Xie, Jiawei Yao (2020)
- Proceedings of the 2020 DigitalFUTURES - co-editor with Philip Yuan, Jiawei Yao, Chao Yan, Xiang Wang (2021)
- Proceedings of the 2021 DigitalFUTURES - co-editor with Philip Yuan, Jiawei Yao, Chao Yan, Xiang Wang (2021)
- Architecture in the Age of Artificial Intelligence: An Introduction to AI for Architects (2022)
- Machine Hallucinations: Architecture and AI - co-editor with Matias del Campo (2022)

His books have been translated into eight different languages, including Spanish, Chinese, Romanian, Portuguese, Korean, Polish, Persian and Macedonian.

== See also ==
- Joseph Rykwert
- Achim Menges
