= Byggekunst =

Architecture magazine published in Norway (1919–2007)

- Categories: Architecture magazine
- Publisher: National Association of Norwegian Architects
- Founder: National Association of Norwegian Architects
- Founded: 1919
- Final issue: 2007
- Country: Norway
- Based in: Oslo
- Language: Norwegian
- ISSN: 0007-7518
- OCLC: 769297139

Byggekunst (Norwegian: Building art) was a Norwegian language architecture magazine published between 1919 and 2007 in Oslo, Norway. The subtitle of the magazine was Norske arkitekters tidsskrift for arkitektur og anvendt kunst.

== History and profile ==
Byggekunst was launched in 1919 as a successor of Teknisk Ukeblad. Arkitektur og Dekorativ Kunst. The founder and publisher of the magazine was the National Association of Norwegian Architects (Norske Arkitekters Landsforbund). The association was consisted of young art historians. The magazine became the official media outlet of the association and was based in Oslo. The special issue of Byggekunst in 1952 was edited by the members of the Congrès Internationaux d'Architecture Moderne.

In the early years Byggekunst included reports on international exhibitions. It published the proceedings of the conferences organized by the National Association of Norwegian Architects. The contributors of the magazine criticised the absence of contemporary Norwegian architecture at that time in their articles. One of the significant contributors was Ole Landmark, a Norwegian architect. Byggekunst featured an article by Helene Støren Kobbe, architect and head of the general planning department of Oslo, about the new projects for central Oslo in 1957.

Christian Norberg-Schulz served as the editor-in-chief of Byggekunst between 1963 and 1978. The magazine ceased publication in 2007 and was succeeded by another magazine, Arkitektur N.
