= The Culture of Building =

1999 book by Howard Davis

- Author: Howard Davis
- Language: English
- Genre: Non-fiction
- Publisher: Oxford University Press
- Publication date: 1999
- Publication place: United States
- ISBN: 978-0-19-530593-7
- OCLC: 0195305930

The Culture of Building (Oxford University Press) is a 1999 book (reprinted in 2006) by Howard Davis, a professor of architecture at the University of Oregon. It describes how buildings throughout the ages and varied settings are products of a building culture – the "coordinated system of knowledge, rules, procedures, and habit that surrounds the building process in a given place and time". Davis suggests that this culture is a cross-global phenomenon in which thousands of buildings are produced through shared and predictable methods of working.

== Bibliography ==
- Davis, Howard (2006), The Culture of Building, New York, NY: Oxford University Press, ISBN 978-0-19-530593-7, OCLC 0195305930
