= Joseph Rykwert =

Polish-British historian (1926–2024)

Joseph Rykwert CBE
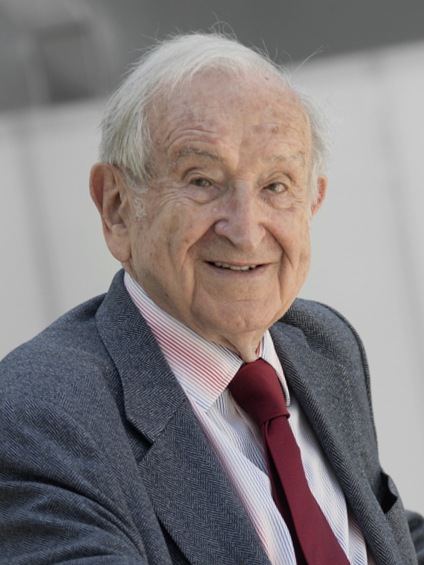
- Rykwert in 2013
- Born: 5 April 1926; Warsaw, Poland
- Died: October 2024 (aged 98); London, England
- Citizenship: United Kingdom
- Education: Bartlett School of Architecture; Architectural Association
- Occupation: Architectural historian
- Spouses: Jane Morton (divorced); Anne Engel (m. 1972; died 2015)
- Children: 1

Joseph Rykwert CBE (5 April 1926 – 17 or 18 October 2024) (Note: Sources differed on whether Rykwert died on 17 or 18 October 2024.) was a British architectural historian and writer. He was the Paul Philippe Cret Professor of Architecture at the University of Pennsylvania, and one of the foremost architectural historians and critics of his generation. He spent most of his working life in the United Kingdom and the United States. He taught the history and theory of architecture at several institutions in Europe and North America. Rykwert is the author of many influential works on architecture, including The Idea of a Town (1963), On Adam's House in Paradise (1972), The Dancing Column (1996) and The Seduction of Place (2000). All of his books have been translated into several languages.

== Biography ==
The son of Jewish parents Elizabeth Melup and Szymon Rykwert, Rykwert was born in Warsaw in 1926 and moved to England in 1939, on the eve of the Second World War. Rykwert was educated at Charterhouse and then at the Bartlett School of Architecture (University College, London) and the Architectural Association in London. His first academic posts were lecturing at Hammersmith School of Arts & Crafts and subsequently at the Ulm School of Design from 1958, and then as Librarian and Tutor at the Royal College of Art from 1961 to 1967 where he obtained his PhD. He was appointed Professor of Art at the newly created University of Essex, a post he held from 1967 until 1980, when he moved to Cambridge first as Slade Professor of Fine Art and then as Reader in Architecture. Here Rykwert continued his influential master's programme, taught with the architectural critic Dalibor Vesely. In 1988 Rykwert was appointed the Paul Philippe Cret Professor of Architecture at the University of Pennsylvania, a post he held until 1998; he was emeritus Professor.

Joseph Rykwert lectured or taught at many major schools of architecture throughout the world and held visiting appointments at Princeton, the Cooper Union, New York, Harvard Graduate School of Design, the University of Sydney, of Louvain, the Institut d'Urbanisme, Paris, the Central European University and others: in 1998–99 he was a British Academy visiting professor at the University of Bath. He held senior fellowships at the Center for Advanced Studies in the Visual Arts, Washington, and the Getty Center for the History of Art and the Humanities. In 1984 Rykwert was appointed Chevalier dans l’ordre des Arts et des Lettres. He held honorary degrees from the University of Edinburgh (1995), the University of Cordoba, Argentina (1998), the University of Bath (2000), of Toronto (2005) Rome (20005) and Trieste (2007), and was a member of the Italian Accademia di San Luca and the Polish Academy. In 2000 he was awarded the Bruno Zevi prize in architectural history by the Biennale of Venice, and in 2009 the Gold Medal Bellas Artes, Madrid. He was president of the International Council of Architectural Critics (CICA) from 1996 and was the recipient of the 2014 Royal Gold Medal. He was appointed Commander of the Order of the British Empire (CBE) in the 2014 Birthday Honours for services to architecture. In May 2016, he received an honorary degree in pedagogy at the University of Bologna.

=== Personal life and death ===
After a marriage to Jane Morton ended in divorce, Rykwert married Anne Engel (died 2015) in 1972. He had one son. Rykwert died at his home in London in October 2024, at the age of 98.

== Works ==
Rykwert's preoccupations were multifold, but some particular themes stand out. His work is fundamentally concerned with the origin of architectural ideas and, having experienced displacement himself at an early age, with our sense of 'place'. In The Idea of a Town: The Anthropology of Urban Form in Rome, Italy and the Ancient World (first published in 1963 and in two subsequent editions), rather than accept the archaeologists’ viewpoint of the ancient city as an outcome of practical settlement needs, Rykwert broke new ground in understanding the ancient town as a product of sacred and symbolic rituals. The book served as a timely critique of post-war New Town developments. In On Adam’s House in Paradise: The Idea of the Primitive Hut in Architectural History (1972 and subsequent editions) Rykwert examined the persistent idea that architecture could be returned to a lost state of accord with nature, an accord symbolised by the fabled idea that Adam had built a house in Eden. In The First Moderns: The Architects of the Eighteenth Century (1980), Rykwert traced the origins of many modern ideas that are commonly assumed to be recent inventions (such as optics and perspective). The book is not a conventional history of style, but rather one of ideas and culture. Frances Yates explained this novelty of approach in The Times Literary Supplement: ‘The range of Rykwert's learning is enormous. History of gardens, Chinese influences, festival architecture, all contribute to the overflowing wealth. Great figures in the history of thought and science — Bacon, Newton, Vico — are seen from new angles....This is no superficial history of styles, no conventional history of ideas. It invigorates both through the attempt at a new kind of history of architecture.’ In The Dancing Column: On Order in Architecture (1996) Rykwert turned his attention to the origins of the architectural Orders, and more recently in The Seduction of Place: The History and Future of Cities (2000) to the question of how to make successful urban spaces and forms in cities today.

Throughout his career Rykwert had been preoccupied with the work of the Renaissance architect Leon Battista Alberti. In 1955 Rykwert published an annotated edition of Leoni's 1756 translation of Alberti's treatise, entitled The Ten Books of Architecture, by L.B. Alberti, and this was followed in 1989 with a new translation from Latin, entitled On the Art of Building in Ten Books (published with Robert Tavernor and Neil Leach). In 1994 Rykwert co-curated (with Robert Tavernor and Anne Rykwert) an international exhibition on Alberti's work, held at the Palazzo Te in Mantua. Alberti's overlapping interest in architectural theory and practice, and his conception of the architect as a philosopher and student of many arts, led Rykwert to identify him as representing the model architect for an age where the role of the designer is in danger of being reduced to that of a businessman or technocrat. The conception of architecture as a product of inter-related disciplines and as a sister to other visual arts informs Rykwert's latest book, The Judicious Eye: Architecture Against the Other Arts, published in 2008.

Joseph Rykwert married his second wife, Anne, during his time in Essex, and she was a collaborator on notable works including the international Alberti exhibition and a book on the Adam brothers. Rykwert's teaching has influenced several generations of architects and historians. Sir James Stirling commented on The First Moderns, for example, that it was: ‘An erudite lead into my favourite period (early nineteenth century) with amazing revelations on the architectural heroes of the time.’ Many of Rykwert's former pupils have gone on to have significant careers in their own right, such as Daniel Libeskind, Shams Naga, Eric Parry, Alberto Pérez-Gómez, Mohsen Mostafavi, Robert Tavernor, Vaughan Hart, John Macarthur, and David Leatherbarrow. Many university departments of architecture in the United Kingdom or America employ members of staff who were taught by Rykwert.

Unlike many architectural historians before him, Joseph Rykwert had not been concerned with architectural style or the classical language per se, but rather with the meaning of a particular design that should always find its own appropriate expression. Throughout his work he had been concerned with professional architectural practice as much as with history and theory, and with the ways in which buildings are actually designed and made.

== Publications (selection) ==
- The Golden House (1947)
- The Ten Books of Architecture, by L.B. Alberti (annotated edn of Leoni's translation of 1756 (1955)
- Church Building (1966)
- On Adam's House in Paradise: The Idea of the Primitive Hut in Architectural History (Museum of Modern Art, first edition, 1972)
- The Idea of a Town: The Anthropology of Urban Form in Rome, Italy, and The Ancient World (first edition, 1963)
- The First Moderns: The Architects of the Eighteenth Century (1980)
- The Necessity of Artifice (1982)
- The Brothers Adam (with Anne Rykwert, 1985)
- Leon Battista Alberti's On the Art of Building in Ten Books translated by Joseph Rykwert, Robert Tavernor and Neil Leach (1991)
- The Dancing Column: On Order in Architecture (1996)
- The Seduction of Place: The History and Future of Cities (2000)
- Body and Building: Essays on the Changing Relation of Body and Architecture edited by George Dodds and Robert Tavernor (2002)
- Structure and Meaning in Human Settlements (Editor, with Tony Atkin, 2005)
- The Judicious Eye: Architecture Against the Other Arts (2008)
