= David Leatherbarrow =

American art historian

David Leatherbarrow is Professor of Architecture and Chair of the Graduate Group in Architecture at the University of Pennsylvania School of Design, Philadelphia, where he has taught since 1984. He received his B.Arch. from the University of Kentucky and holds a Ph.D. in Art from the University of Essex. He has also taught in England, at Cambridge University and the University of Westminster (formerly the Polytechnic of Central London).

He is primarily known for his contributions to the field of architectural phenomenology. Questions of how architecture appears, how architecture is perceived, and how topography shapes architecture often direct his research.

He is influenced by architectural theorists Dalibor Vesely and Joseph Rykwert, who both taught at Essex in the 1970s and also influenced Alberto Pérez-Gómez and numerous other scholars in the field of architectural phenomenology and history.

== Select list of Leatherbarrow's writings ==
- The Roots of Architectural Invention: Site, Enclosure, Materials, Cambridge: Cambridge University Press 1993.
- On Weathering: The Life of Buildings in Time, with Mohsen Mostafavi, Cambridge, Massachusetts: The MIT Press 1993.
- Uncommon Ground: Architecture, Technology, and Topography, Cambridge, Massachusetts: The MIT Press 2000.
- Topographical Stories: Studies in Landscape and Architecture, Philadelphia: University of Pennsylvania Press 2004.
- Surface Architecture, with Mohsen Mostafavi, Cambridge, Massachusetts: The MIT Press 2005.
- Architecture Oriented Otherwise, New Haven: Princeton Architectural Press 2008.
- Twentieth-Century Architecture, Companion to the History of Architecture Vol. 4, with Alexander Eisenschmidt, Chichester, West Sussex: Wiley 2017.
- Three Cultural Ecologies, with Richard Wesley, London: Routledge 2017.
- Building Time: Architecture, Event, and Experience, Bloomsbury Visual Arts 2020.

== Awards & Recognitions ==
- Topaz Medallion for Excellence in Architectural Education, awarded by AIA and ACSA, 2020.
