= Howard Davis (professor of architecture) =

Howard Davis is an American writer and professor of architecture at the University of Oregon in Eugene. A native of New York City, he studied physics at Cooper Union and at Northwestern University and received a master's degree in architecture from the University of California, Berkeley, where he worked with Christopher Alexander. He has worked on projects in the Pacific Northwest, India, England, Mexico and Israel.

He is known for his research into vernacular architecture and building history, published in the book The Culture of Building (1999, reprinted in paperback 2006). He also collaborated with Christopher Alexander on The Production of Houses (1985), an account of an innovative housing project in Mexicali, Baja California, Mexico. His current research is concerned with urban buildings that combine commercial and residential uses; museums and memorials to war; housing; and American architectural education. His latest book is "Living Over the Store: Architecture and Local Urban Life." Davis was founding co-editor of Buildings & Landscapes, the journal of the Vernacular Architecture Forum.

The Association of Collegiate Schools of Architecture honored Davis with the ACSA Distinguished Professor Award in 2009.
