= Thomas Thiis-Evensen =

Norwegian architect (born 1946)

- Born: 17 May 1946 (age 80); Porsgrunn, Norway
- Education: Oslo School of Architecture and Design
- Occupation: Architect
- Awards: Fritt Ord Honorary Award

Thomas Thiis-Evensen (born 17 May 1946) is a Norwegian architect.

He was born in Porsgrunn to physician Eyvind Thiis-Evensen and Ingeborg Johanna Rosenvold. He graduated from the Oslo School of Architecture and Design in 1972. He was appointed professor at the Lund University from 1989, and at the Oslo School of Architecture and Design from 1992. His books include Byens uttrykksformer from 1992 and Europas arkitekturhistorie: fra idé til form (1995). He received the Fritt Ord Honorary Award in 1990.
