= Marco Frascari =

Italian architect and architectural theorist

Marco Frascari (1945 – June 2, 2013) was an Italian architect and architectural theorist. He was born in Mantua, in northern Italy, in 1945. He studied with Carlo Scarpa and Arrigo Rudi at Università Iuav di Venezia and received his PhD in architecture from the University of Pennsylvania. He taught for several years at the University of Pennsylvania, then as visiting professor at Columbia and Harvard. He served as G. Truman Ward Professor of Architecture at Virginia Tech from 1998 to 2005. In 2005, he became director of the David Azrieli School of Architecture and Urbanism at Carleton University in Ottawa, Canada. Marco Frascari died in Ottawa on June 2, 2013 after a protracted illness.

== Publications ==
- Eleven Exercises in the Art of Architectural Drawing: Slow Food for the Architect's Imagination (2011) Routledge
- Monsters of Architecture (1991)download .pdf
- "The Tell-the-Tale-Detail" (1981)
- "Una Pillola per sognare ... una casa" (1996)
- "Due Anni di Esperienze dello Studio Estivo dell' Universita della Pennsylvania In Mantova" (1994)
- "Architects, never eat your maccheroni without a proper sauce! A macaronic meditation on the anti-Cartesian nature of architectural imagination" Nordic Journal of Architectural Research
- "Foreword to Alfonso Corona-Martinez' The Architectural Project,2002
- "A tradition of architectural figures: a search for Vita Beata" in Body and Building: Essays on the Changing Relation of Body and Architecture. George Dodds and Robert Tavernor, eds. 2002.
