= Nader El-Bizri =

Lebanese academic

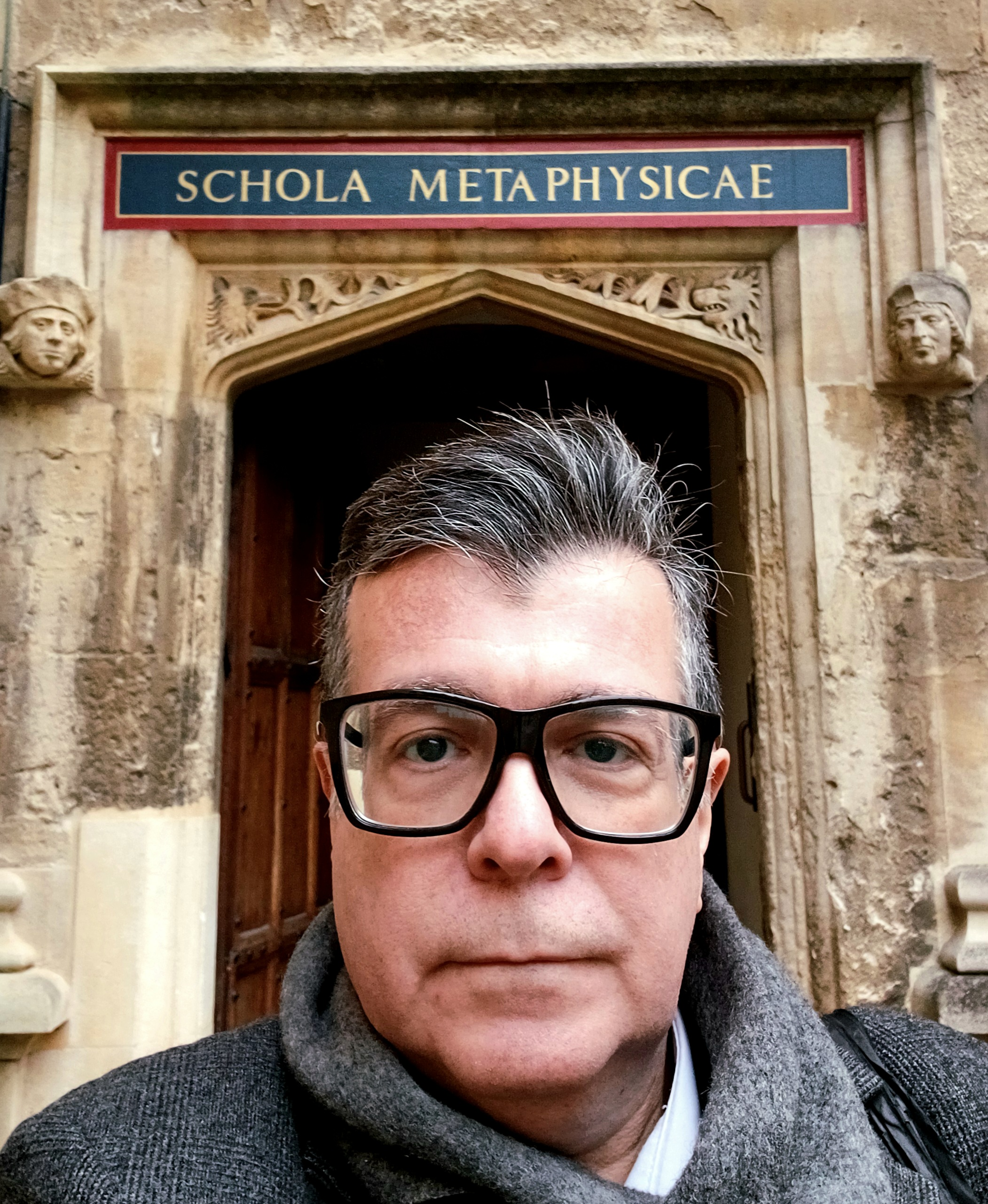
- Education: BArch (architecture), American University of Beirut (1989); M.Arch II, Harvard University (1994); Graduate studies (philosophy), Harvard University (1995); PhD (philosophy), New School for Social Research (1999)
- Occupations: Professor of philosophy and civilization studies, American University of Beirut
- Website: sas.ac.uk

Nader El-Bizri (Arabic: نادر البزري, nādir al-bizrĩ) served as the dean of the College of Arts, Humanities, and Social Sciences at the University of Sharjah. He is currently a Senior Research Fellow at The Warburg Institute at the School of Advanced Study, University of London, and an Affiliated Scholar with the Department of History and Philosophy of Science at the University of Cambridge. He was before that a tenured longstanding full professor of philosophy and civilization studies at the American University of Beirut, where he also acted as an associate dean of the Faculty of Arts and Sciences, and as the director of the General Education program.

El-Bizri specializes in phenomenology, Islamic science and philosophy, and architectural theory. He is the author or editor of several books, including The Phenomenological Quest between Avicenna and Heidegger (2000).

== Education ==
El-Bizri received the M.Arch II postgraduate degree in architecture from the Harvard Graduate School of Design and a PhD in philosophy from the New School for Social Research.

== Career ==
=== Academic positions ===
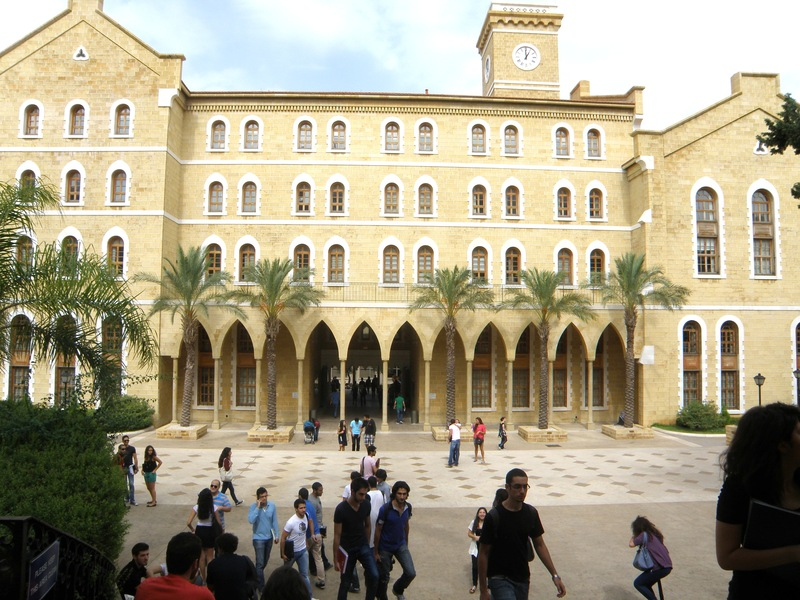
American University of Beirut

El-Bizri is a professor of philosophy and civilization studies at the American University of Beirut, where he is also an associate dean of the faculty of arts and sciences, and the director of the general education program. He was formerly a director of the civilization studies program at the AUB and the coordinator of Islamic studies, and also oversees the Anis Makdisi Program in Literature. He was previously a visiting professor of visual studies at the University of Lincoln and a principal lecturer (reader) in architecture. He was an affiliated senior research fellow in philosophy at the Institute of Ismaili Studies, London, and is general editor (and managing editor ex officio) of an Oxford University Press book series published in association with the Institute of Ismaili Studies, London, entitled: Epistles of the Brethren of Purity Series رسائل إخوان الصفاء . He was a co-manager of a joint project between the Institute of Ismaili Studies and the Institut Français du Proche Orient, formerly based in Damascus and now in Beirut.

El-Bizri was an affiliated research scholar in the department of history and philosophy of science at the University of Cambridge from 1999 to 2010, primarily lecturing on medieval Islamic sciences and philosophy. He has also been a visiting lecturer at the faculty of architecture at the University of Cambridge on Islamic architecture. He holds a Chercheur associé position in history of science and philosophy at the Centre National de la Recherche Scientifique in Paris (Denis-Diderot, Paris VII, UMR 7219, SPHERE) since 2006, and he was previously a lecturer in architecture at the University of Nottingham, and taught at Harvard University. He is a member of the Ordered Universe research team on mediaeval science that is supported by the British Arts and Humanities Research Council (AHRC), which is based at the University of Durham and Oxford University. El-Bizri is an elected member of the Steering Committee of the Société Internationale d'Histoire des Sciences et des Philosophies Arabes et Islamiques (Centre National de la Recherche Scientifique, Paris). 2022 Dean of College of Arts, Humanities & Social Sciences University of Sharjah

=== Writing and television ===
El-Bizri is co-editor of a book series in phenomenology (Springer, formerly Kluwer Academic Publishers; Dordrecht, Netherlands), and as section editor (Islam) of the Encyclopedia of Sciences and Religions (SPRINGER, Dordrecht & Berlin). He is on the editorial boards of series and journals, such as the Cambridge University Press journal Arabic Sciences and Philosophy, Toposophia (series on philosophy and architecture; Lexington Books/Rowman & Littlefield), Institute of Ismaili Studies Texts and Translations Series (London: I. B. Tauris), the Encyclopaedia Islamica (Leiden: E. J. Brill), the Journal of World Philosophies (Indiana University Press), and the Fundamentals of Scientific Research at The Arab Organization for Translation in Beirut (linked to the Centre for Arab Unity Studies). He is the European representative of the Equipe d’Etude et de Recherche sur le Patrimoine Scientifique Arabe, which is part of the Lebanese Centre national de la recherche scientifique (CNRS). He has written for Al-Hayat.

El-Bizri has made several contributions to BBC radio and television cultural programs, including a discussion about the Persian philosopher Avicenna with Melvin Bragg and other guests on BBC Radio 4's In Our Time, and an interview with Jim Al-Khalili about Ibn al-Haytham for BBC Four's Science and Islam series. He also recently took part in a panel on philosophy that was aired on France Culture in Paris in the series Les Chemins de la philosophie that is moderated by Adèle Van Reeth.

=== Awards ===
El-Bizri has received several awards, including the Kuwait Prize 2014 from the Kuwait Foundation for the Advancement of Sciences. He has been also ranked as one of the "Thought Leaders" in the Arab world via the Berggruen Institute and its various partners.

== Books ==
As author and co-author

- (2000). The Phenomenological Quest between Avicenna and Heidegger (Binghamton, N.Y.: Global Publications, SUNY); reprinted with an updated preface in 2014.
- (2004). L'expérience (Paris: Editions la Découverte), co-authored with Jean-Pierre Cléro, Martin Jay, G-K Karanth, and Achille Mbembe, with a foreword by Nadia Tazi.

As editor and co-editor

- (2008). Epistles of the Brethren of Purity. The Ikhwan al-Safa' and their Rasa'il: An Introduction (Oxford: Oxford University Press). Contributor of the "Prologue", 1–32, and chapter 7: "Epistolary Prolegomena: On Arithmetic and Geometry", 180–213.
- (2012). Epistles of the Brethren of Purity. On Arithmetic and Geometry. Arabic Edition and English Translation of EPISTLES 1 & 2 (Oxford: Oxford University Press).
- (2012). Founding Figures and Commentators in Arabic Mathematics, by Roshdi Rashed (London: Routledge).
- (2013). ‘Islam Division’ of the Encyclopedia of Sciences and Religions, eds. Anne Runehov, Lluis Oviedo et al. (Dordrecht-Berlin: Springer).
- (2014). Recto Verso: Redefining the Sketchbook, co-edited with Angela Bartram and Douglas Gittens (Farnham: Ashgate).
- (2015). Asad Rustum: Mu'assis 'ilm al-tarikh fi al-'alam al-'arabi, co-edited with Lamia Shehadeh, Souad Sleem, Maher Jarrar (Beirut: Dar al-Farabi).
- (2017). Practicing Philosophy in Lebanon (Pratiquer la philosophie au Liban [Mumârasat al-falsafa fî lubnân]), a trilingual volume ed. Nader El-Bizri (Beirut-Bonn: German Orient-Institut Beirut, in association with Dar al-Farabi).
- (2018). Epistles of the Brethren of Purity. On Composition and the Arts. Arabic Edition and English Translation of EPISTLES 6-8; co-edited with Godefroid de Callataÿ (Oxford: Oxford University Press).
- (2018) The Occult Sciences in Pre-modern Islamic Cultures, eds. Nader El-Bizri and Eva Orthmann. Würzburg: Ergon Verlag (Orient-Institut series BTS 138).
- (2022) On Being and Time: The Section on Heidegger in Charles Malik's 1937 Harvard Thesis, ed. Nader El-Bizri. Würzburg: Ergon Verlag (Orient-Institut series BTS 143).

== See also ==
- Alhazen
- Architectural theory
- Avicenna
- Book of Optics
- Brethren of Purity
- Contemporary Islamic philosophy
- Jacques Derrida
- Martin Heidegger
- Khôra
- Maurice Merleau-Ponty
- Phenomenology (architecture)
