= Mohsen Mostafavi =

Iranian-American architect

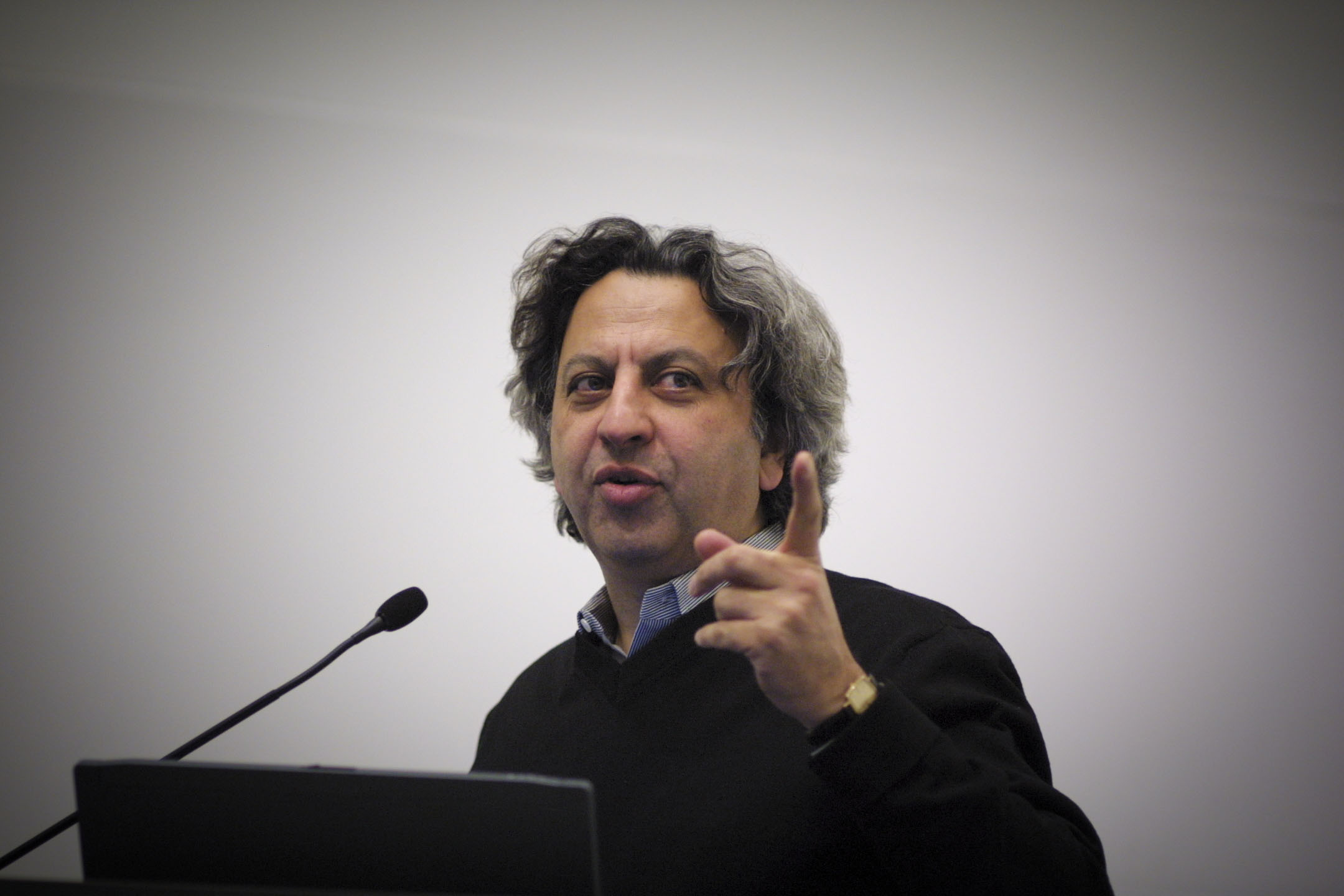
- Mostafavi in 2009.
- Born: 1954 (age 71–72); Isfahan, Imperial State of Iran
- Education: Architectural Association School of Architecture
- Occupation: Architect
- Spouse: Homa Farjadi

Mohsen Mostafavi (born 1954 in Isfahan) is an Iranian-American architect and educator. Mostafavi is currently the Alexander and Victoria Wiley Professor of Design at the Harvard Graduate School of Design. From 2008 through 2019, Mostafavi served as the school's dean.

== Career ==
Mostafavi received a Bachelor of Architecture from the Architectural Association School of Architecture in 1976. He would later teach at Cambridge University, the Städelschule, the University of Pennsylvania, and Harvard University.

On January 1, 2008, Mostafavi was named Dean and Alexander and Victoria Wiley Professor of Design at the Harvard University Graduate School of Design. He had previously been the Gale and Ira Drukier Dean and Arthur L. and Isabel B. Wiesenberger Professor in Architecture at the Cornell University College of Architecture, Art, and Planning.

Mostafavi also serves on the steering committee of the Aga Khan Award for Architecture. He has served on the design committee of the London Development Agency and the Royal Gold Medal. Mostafavi was the head of the LafargeHolcim Awards for Sustainable Construction for Europe in 2005, for the global jury in 2006, and for North America in 2008.

== Works ==
- On Weathering: The Life of Buildings in Time, with David Leatherbarrow, 1993, ISBN 978-0262631440
- Manuel Brullet, with Josep Quetglas, 1998, ISBN 978-8425217524
- Approximations: The Architecture of Peter Märkli, 2002, ISBN 978-0262134002
- Surface Architecture, 2002, ISBN 978-0262621946
- Landscape Urbanism: A Manual for the Machinic Landscape, 2003, ISBN 978-1902902302
- Implicate and Explicate: Aga Khan Award for Architecture, 2011, ISBN 978-3037782422
- Nicholas Hawksmoor: London Churches, with Hélène Binet, 2013, ISBN 978-3037783498
- Ecological Urbanism, with Gareth Doherty, 2015, ISBN 978-3037784679
- Urbanismo ecológico en América Latina, with Gareth Doherty, Marina Correia, Ana Maria Duran Calisto, and Giannina Braschi, 2019, ISBN 9788425229480.
- IJP The Book of Surfaces forward for the book by George L. Legendre, 2003, ISBN 1-902902-32-7

== Personal life ==
Mostafavi is married to Homa Farjadi, who is currently principal of Farjadi Architects and Professor of Practice at the University of Pennsylvania School of Design.

Preceded by Alan A. Altshuler	Dean; Harvard University Graduate School of Design; January 1, 2008 – June 30, 2019	Succeeded by Sarah Whiting
