= Matthias Sauerbruch =

Matthias Sauerbruch (born February 4, 1955 in Konstanz, Germany) is a German architect, urban planner, and professor. He is a founding partner of the architecture firm Sauerbruch Hutton.

== Biography ==
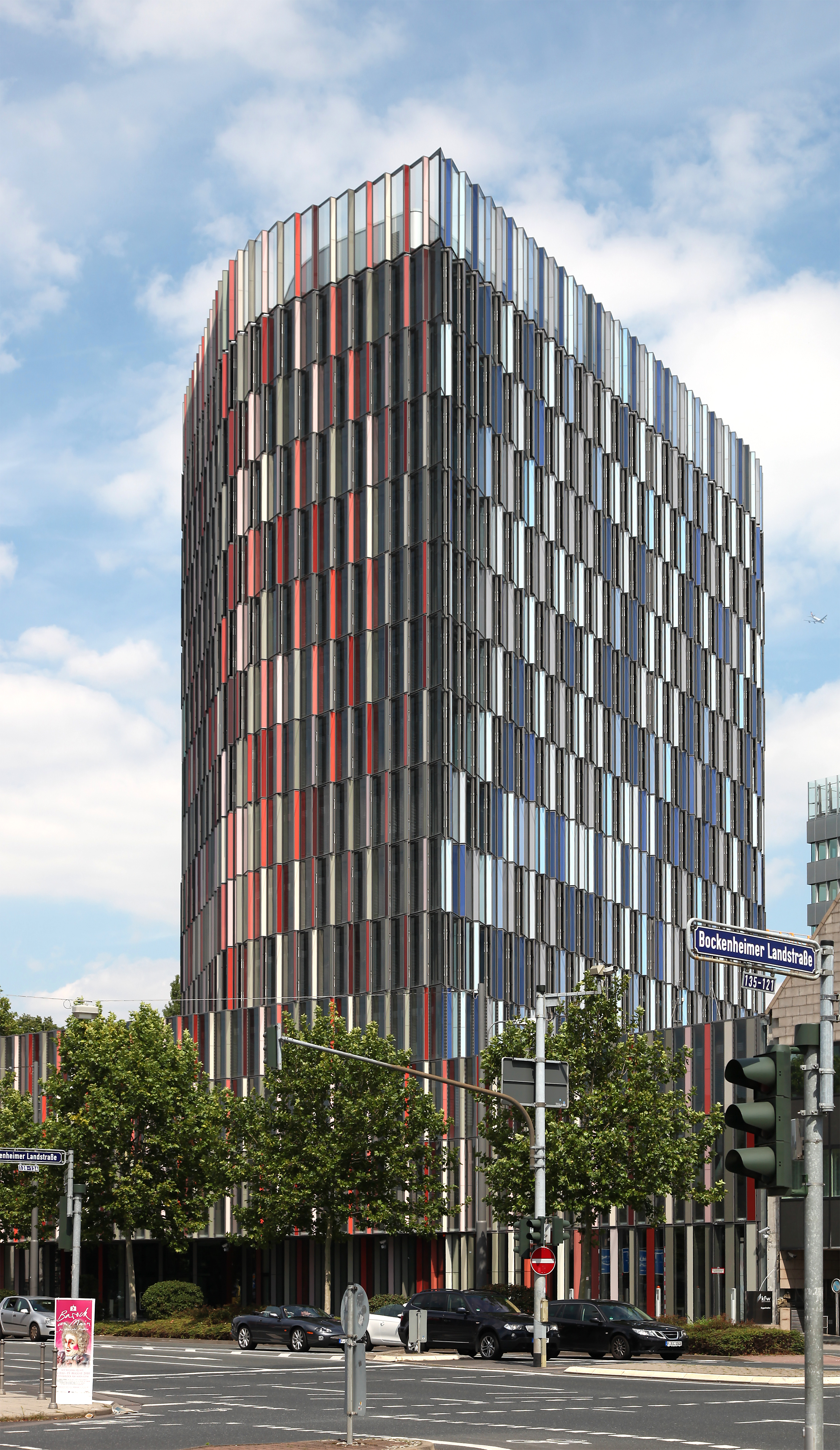
Westarkade in Frankfurt, 2006

=== Education and career ===
Matthias Sauerbruch is the son of the painter Hans Sauerbruch (1910–1996) and the grandson of the surgeon Ferdinand Sauerbruch. His brother was the art educator Horst Sauerbruch.

After finishing high school, he worked for two years at an architecture firm in Stuttgart. During this time, he considered becoming a stage designer. He studied at the Hochschule der Künste Berlin and the Architectural Association School of Architecture in London. While studying in Berlin, he also worked as an extra at the Schillertheater.

From 1984 to 1988, he was a partner at the Office for Metropolitan Architecture (OMA) in London, where he and founding partner Ilias Zengelis designed the Residential and commercial building at Checkpoint Charlie, a key project of the Internationale Bauausstellung 1987 (IBA) in Berlin.

=== Practice and academia ===
In 1989, Sauerbruch founded the architecture, urbanism, and design firm Sauerbruch Hutton in London together with Louisa Hutton. Since 1992, the firm has been based in Berlin. Their first major project was the GSW Headquarters in Berlin-Kreuzberg in the 1990s. The office has since completed numerous projects across Europe, including the German Environment Agency in Dessau, the Museum Brandhorst in Munich, the extension of Experimenta Heilbronn, and the M9 museum complex in Mestre, Venice.

From 1995 to 2001, Sauerbruch was a professor at Technische Universität Berlin. He then taught at the State Academy of Fine Arts Stuttgart from 2001 to 2007. In 2005, he was a visiting professor at the University of Virginia. From 2007 to 2010, he and Louisa Hutton were visiting professors at the Harvard University Graduate School of Design in Cambridge, Massachusetts. In 2013, Sauerbruch curated the exhibition kultur:stadt for the Academy of Arts in Berlin and the Kunsthaus Graz. From 2012 to 2014, he was a guest professor at the Berlin University of the Arts.

=== Memberships and honors ===
Sauerbruch is a member of the Academy of Arts in Berlin, where he led the Architecture Section from 2018 until being succeeded by Fritz Frenkler in 2021. He has been an Honorary Fellow of the American Institute of Architects (AIA) since 2013 and of the Royal Institute of the Architects of Ireland (RIAI) since 2019.

He is a founding member of the German Sustainable Building Council (DGNB). Sauerbruch was a member of the Baukollegium Zürich from 2010 to 2014, and of the Munich Commission for Urban Design from 2016 to 2021. He also served on the board of trustees of the Bauhaus Dessau Foundation, was a jury member for the Villa Massimo awards, and is a fellow of the Institute for Urban Design in New York City.

== Selected publications ==
- Matthias Sauerbruch, Louisa Hutton: GSW Hauptverwaltung Berlin – gsw headquarters berlin, Lars Müller Publishers, Baden 2000, ISBN 3-907078-14-4.
- Matthias Sauerbruch, Louisa Hutton: Sauerbruch Hutton Archive, Lars Müller Publishers, Zurich 2006, ISBN 978-3-03778-083-1.
- Matthias Sauerbruch, Louisa Hutton: Sauerbruch Hutton – Colour in Architecture, Distanz Verlag, Berlin 2012, ISBN 978-3-942405-38-6.
- Matthias Sauerbruch, Louisa Hutton: Sauerbruch Hutton Archive 2, Lars Müller Publishers, Zurich 2016, ISBN 978-3-03778-389-4.
- Uwe Schröder, Thomas Schmitz, Franziska Kramer, Anja Neuefeind (eds.): Orte der Farbe. Zur chromatischen Stimmung von Räumen der Architektur., Walther König Verlag, Cologne 2019, ISBN 978-3-96098-524-2.
