= Doug Clelland =

Scottish architect, educator and writer

Douglas Jarvie Clelland
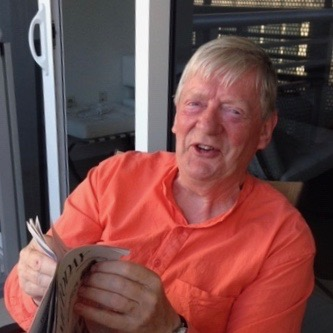
- Doug Clelland
- Born: Douglas Jarvie Clelland; 13 May 1945 (age 81); Glasgow, Scotland
- Education: The Mackintosh School of Architecture, Glasgow; Kingston College of Art (now Kingston University), London; The Architectural Association School of Architecture, London
- Occupations: Architect and author
- Parent(s): Robert Clelland (father); Anstruther MacDonald (mother)
- Practice: JARVIE Architecture and Writing Limited (CEO)
- Buildings: Extension to the Mulberry House School, London; West Coast Energy, Mold; Norris90 – Social Housing, Liverpool; Siemens VT, Berlin; 10 Friedrichstraße, Berlin; Gartnernes Forsikring, Copenhagen; The Studio / Windle House, London
- Projects: Gwent Health Centre; Doll's House; Durham University Oriental Museum; Little Big House; Tri'Rhena Pavilion, Basel, Switzerland; Operation Desert Flower, Southern Spain; Guggenheim Museum, Helsinki
- Design: Kentish Town, London; Marsham Street, London; Eastern Boulevard, Glasgow; Central Edinburgh; Wilhelmstraße, Berlin; Friedrichstraße 10-12, Berlin; Allerton Bywater Millennium Community, Yorkshire; Norris Green Boot Estate, Liverpool; Osbaldwick, YorkNewton Aycliffe – zero carbon housing Narrows Island, Liverpool
- Website: dougclelland.com

Douglas Jarvie Clelland (born 13 May 1945) is a Scottish architect, educator and writer.

As an architect, he has practised as Clelland Associates (1972–1996), Aire Design (1996–2007) and JARVIE Architecture and Writing (2015–2022). His most recent completed building is an extension to the Mulberry House School in London. He has also acted as a design consultant to JIG Architects (2007–2015). His recent teaching positions include Herbert Rowse Professor of Architecture and Urban Design at Liverpool John Moores University (1994–2010) and professor of architecture at the Beuth University of Applied Sciences in Berlin (2013–2016). He is currently emeritus professor at Liverpool John Moores University and continues to teach in Berlin. He has written extensively as an academic, and has written non-architectural works including God's Brains and Joyful Darkness.

== Early life ==
Doug Clelland was born in Glasgow in May 1945 and attended Eastbank Primary School until the age of nine. He completed his schooling at Hutchesons' Boys Grammar School.

== Student life ==
In 1963, Clelland commenced part-time architectural education at the Mackintosh School of Architecture, Glasgow School of Art.

He moved to London in 1966, studying for a year at Kingston College of Art. He worked on projects including a proposed S-Bahn station in Leicester and sites in Kidderminster and Notting Hill. In 1967 he worked in Canada and the United States for various architects, including John Andrews and Louis Kahn.

He completed his formal architectural education at the Architectural Association School of Architecture in London, obtaining his diploma in architecture in 1970. Projects there included a proposed eastern expansion of London and a river edge urban development in the Isles of Grain and Sheppey.

== Career ==
He taught at the Architectural Association from 1971 to 1975, sharing units with Daniel Libeskind and Dalibor Vesely. He also worked at the Polytechnic of Central London (PCL), where he ran the urban architecture studio until 1988.

He commenced private practice in 1972 and completed a set of small buildings in London, Nackington near Canterbury and Forgandenny in Perthshire. Continuing to have his base in London, the Weinreb Studio in Highgate, London (1988), received a Royal Institute of British Architects (RIBA) regional award and the Gartnernes Forsikring in Taastrup, Denmark (1989) a Danish design award.

His involvement with Berlin commenced in 1977 and since then, he has published a number of journals on the city, was involved in the Internationale Bauausstellung (IBA) from 1984 to 1987, and designed buildings for Siemens and GSW Immobilien. He was elected to the Berlin Architektenkammer in 1992.

Maintaining bases in London and Berlin, he participated in the Internationale Bauausstellung (1984–1987), was a member of a series of juries for competitions in post-1989 Berlin, and completed two buildings there, one for Siemens.

From 1989 to 1991, Clelland lived largely in his home city of Glasgow. During its time as European Capital of Culture in 1990, he conceived and managed the keynote event Glasgow's Glasgow.

He returned to full-timem teaching in 1994 as the Herbert James Rowse Professor of Architecture and Urban Design at Liverpool John Moores University, where he remained until 2010. Since then he has mixed practice, teaching and writing – in recent years committing more time and resources to travel and, as with many colleagues and friends, to a reflection on globalisation.

He acted as a professor of architecture at the Beuth University of Applied Sciences in Berlin and professor of architecture at the University of Malta.

Clelland continues to practice as an architect and is the author of two non-architectural books. He divides his time between Oxfordshire, Gers in France and Berlin. He is the father of three daughters and one son.

== Other interests and activities ==
Clelland has served on the City of London and Westminster Society of Architects (CLAWSA) branch of the RIBA, and on the Council of the Architectural Association School of Architecture, London. He has served as a Governor of the Bramber Nursery School in Fulham, West London. He has been an invigilator and reader for the RIBA on the Dissertation Medal in 1994, 1995 and 1996 and has been Chairman of the Projects Committee of the Merseyside Civic Society. He has been a participant in the Standing Conference for Heads of Schools of Architecture (SCHOSA) and has been active in the European Association for Architectural Education (EAAE).

Doug has been married four times and has four children.

== Gallery ==
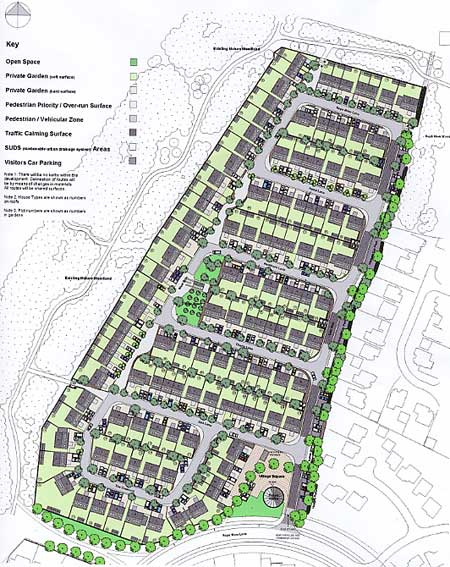
Newton Aycliffe - Zero Carbon Housing

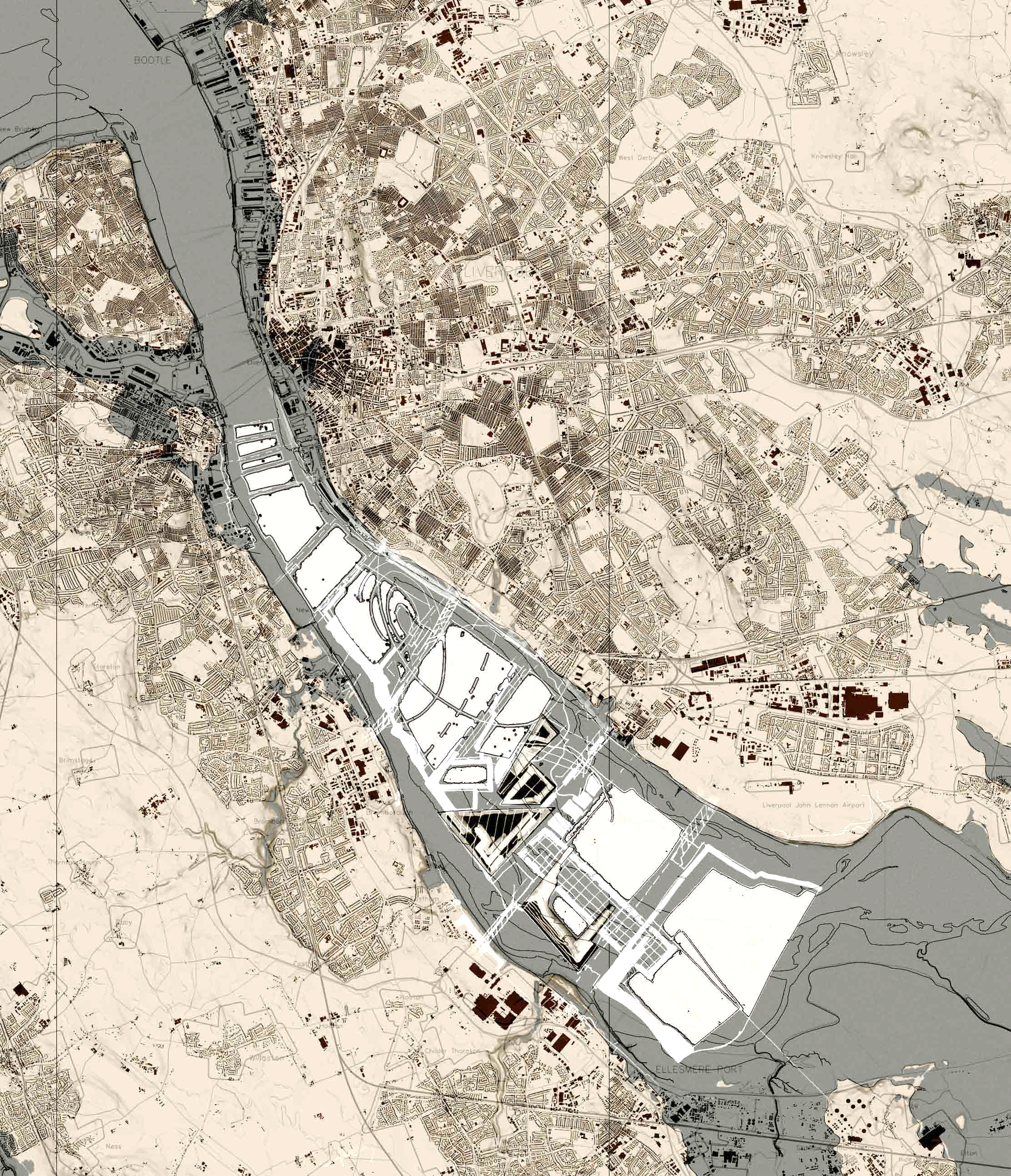
Narrows Island, Liverpool

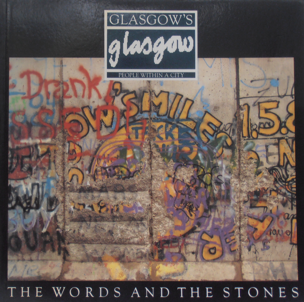
The Words and The Stones

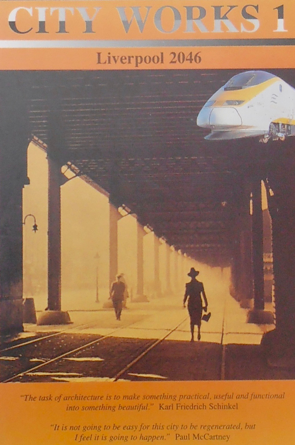
CityWorks1
