= Mackereth =

Mackereth is a surname. Notable people with the surname include:

- Beverly D. Mackereth (born 1958), American politician
- Gilbert Mackereth (1892–1962), British army officer and diplomat
- Sally Mackereth (born 1966), British Architect
- Betty Mackereth (born 1924) British Secretary to Philip Larkin
