= Sedu =

Sedu may refer to:

- Ewaldus Martinus Sedu (born 1963), Indonesian Roman Catholic bishop
- Lamassu, or Šêdu, an Assyrian deity

== See also ==
- Sedus, a German office-furniture manufacturer
