= Winifred Ryle =

British architect

- Born: 1897 (age 128–129)
- Education: Architectural Association School of Architecture
- Occupation: Architect
- Spouse: Richard Henry Maddock
- Practice: Associated architectural firm[s]

Winifred Maddock (née Winifred Ryle, 3 February 1897 - 3 October 1987) was a British architect. She was one of the first women to attend the Architectural Association School of Architecture, and would go on to publish an article about Women as Architects in the Architectural Association Journal

== Biography ==
Ryle was born on 3 February 1897 in Monken Hadley although the family moved to Brighton that same year. Her father, Dr Reginald John Ryle, a doctor, and her mother Catherine Scott, a suffragette, had ten children, of which Ryle was the seventh. She was home schooled until she was seven, then attended Brighton and Hove High School, before studying art at Brighton School of Art.

Ryle's great uncles included notable architects George Gilbert Scott and George Frederick Bodley, so when Architectural Association School of Architecture allowed women in 1917, both her and her cousin Elisabeth Scott attended. Ryle was one of the first four women to attend the school. The following year Ryle and Ruth Lowy published an article about Women as Architects in the Architectural Association Journal, paving the way for more female architects. By 1920, she was being paid to teach classes at the School of Architecture. In 1922, she was one of the first women to become full members of the Architectural Association alongside Ethel Charles and her sister.

She married Richard Henry Maddock, also an architect, on 26 February 1924, and the couple formed an architectural partnership. They would go on to design buildings in Sutton, Surrey, and Pangbourne, Berkshire. Ryle was an active member of the Sutton chapter of South London Quakers.
