= Frank Harmon =

American architect

Frank Harmon is a writer, architect, professor and public speaker in Raleigh, North Carolina.

== Biography ==
Harmon was born in Georgia and grew up in Greensboro, North Carolina. He was educated in North Carolina State University’s School of Design in Raleigh, NC (1959–61) and in the Architectural Association in London, England (1967). He lives in Raleigh in the home and gardens that he and his late wife, landscape architect Judy Harmon, designed together.

== Career ==
Harmon has worked with the firm McMinn, Norfleet & Wicker of Greensboro, NC (1968–70) and Richard Meier & Associates, New York (1970–73). He was a principal in the firm Harmon & Simeloff RIBA in London from 1974 to 1979, before founding his current firm, Frank Harmon Architect, in Raleigh in 1985. The firm was ranked 13th among the nation's Top 50 firms by Architect magazine In 2010.

== Academia ==
He has been a visiting critic at Columbia University, the University of Toronto, the University of Virginia, UNC-Charlotte, the University of Liverpool, and Cambridge University since 1981. He has taught at the Architectural Association, Auburn University, and North Carolina State University, where he is currently a Professor In Practice in the College of Design. In 2009, he was selected to present the annual Harwell Hamilton Harris Lecture at the college. In 2014, Harmon was a featured lecturer at the Harvard University Graduate School of Design.

== Awards and fellowships ==
In 1995, Harmon received the North Carolina Architecture Foundation’s Kamphoefner Prize for Distinguished Design Over a Ten-Year Period. The Raleigh News & Observer named him "Tarheel of the Week" in 2005. A fellow of the American Institute of Architects, he is also a founding member of the Triangle Architecture Design Society (TADS).

Harmon presented "Architects Discuss America’s New Regionalism" during the 2005, 2006, and 2007 National AIA Conventions, and was an invited speaker for Dwell Magazine’s Dwell On Design Conference in San Francisco. He was subsequently featured in Dwell’s "Conversations" sections. He has also been featured on "The Story" with Dick Gordon (American Public Radio).

In 2013, Harmon received the F. Carter Williams Gold Medal from the North Carolina Chapter of the American Institute of Architects, the highest honor the AIA NC gives to an architect. In his nomination letter for Harmon, fellow architect Jeffrey Lee, FAIA, wrote:

Across the architectural profession, Frank Harmon, FAIA, is the face of North Carolina architecture. Through his words, his deeds, and the work of his firm, he has brought to a national audience a glimpse of the unique character and architectural culture of his home state... Frank cares about how his buildings enhance the lives of those who use them. He cares about how they are crafted and detailed. He cares about how they tread softly upon their sites, and he cares deeply about the contribution his buildings make to the architectural legacy of North Carolina.

== Authorship ==
Harmon is a writer on architectural issues and has been published in the international Docomomo Journal. An essay he wrote on North Carolina architecture, "About Corncribs and the Unpainted Aristocracy," was published in Inform: Architecture + Design in the Mid-Atlantic.

He is also the author of the website "Native Places," a collection of thoughts and hand-drawn sketches that illustrate the value of looking closely at buildings and places. "Native Places" is reprinted in Custom Home magazine.

== Recognition ==
Harmon has received thirty-seven AIA North Carolina awards (as of 2010). In 2003, a vacation house he designed in the Bahamas was named Project of the Year by Residential Architect magazine. In 2005, the same magazine named his firm Top Firm of the Year. In 2004, the Iron Studio Harmon that designed for the Penland School of Arts and Crafts, received a Business Week/Architectural Record Honor Award. In 2009, two residences he designed received National AIA Housing Awards.

Harmon's firm also won the professional design competition for the AIA North Carolina Center for Architecture & Design, which was completed in downtown Raleigh, NC, in 2012.

Harmon was featured in the "Conversations" section of Dwell magazine in 2007 and on "The Story" with Dick Gordon (American Public Radio) in 2008. In 2015, he was the featured speaker at Space City for AIA Seattle's design conference.

== Registrations ==
His registration includes the North Carolina Board of Architecture (1970), the National Council of Architectural Registration Boards (1970), the State of New York (1973) and Architects Registration Council of the United Kingdom (1978).
