= Timothy Han =

Timothy Han is the London-based Canadian founder of perfume house Timothy Han / Edition. He was educated at l'Ecole Supérieure des Arts et techniques de la Mode in Paris and the Architectural Association School of Architecture in London. Han was formerly an assistant to John Galliano.

Han is known for championing what he refers to as sustainable luxury as an added value within the luxury industry. In 2010 he helped to co-found the United Nations Platform on Biodiversity in the Fashion and Cosmetics Industries and contributed to the section on Sustainable Luxury for the LID Editorial 2012 publication entitled Luxury and Responsibility.

In 2004 he set up Timothy Han London.
