= Gillian Harrison =

British architect

- Born: 1898
- Died: 1974 (aged 75–76)
- Occupation: Architect
- Spouse: Harry St John Harrison
- Children: Richard
- Parent(s): Henry and Rose Cooke
- Awards: Fellow RIBA
- Practice: Associated architectural firm[s]

Edith Gillian Harrison (1898–1974), née Cooke, was a British architect.

== Early life and education ==
After Roedean School, she trained at the Architectural Association School of Architecture from 1917 to 1922, where she was one of the first four female students.

== Career ==
In 1931 Harrison became the first woman Fellow of the Royal Institute of British Architects. The second woman elected FRIBA was Gertrude Leverkus.

Harrison designed a house in Kent, England, called 'Red Willows' in 1933. The exact location of Red Willows is in Littlestone, Kent where Cooke and Harrison (architects) designed three other houses for clients: Oberlander, Glukstein, and Paton

== Personal life ==
In 1923, she married Harry St John Harrison, also an architect. Together they formed a joint practice called Cooke & Harrison. They had one child, a son, Richard.
