= Penelope Whiting =

British architect (1918–2017)

- Born: 1918; Newcastle upon Tyne
- Died: 28 February 2017 (aged 98–99)
- Occupation: Architect
- Practice: Yorke Rosenberg Mardall
- Projects: Harlow New Town, Essex Gatwick Airport, West Sussex

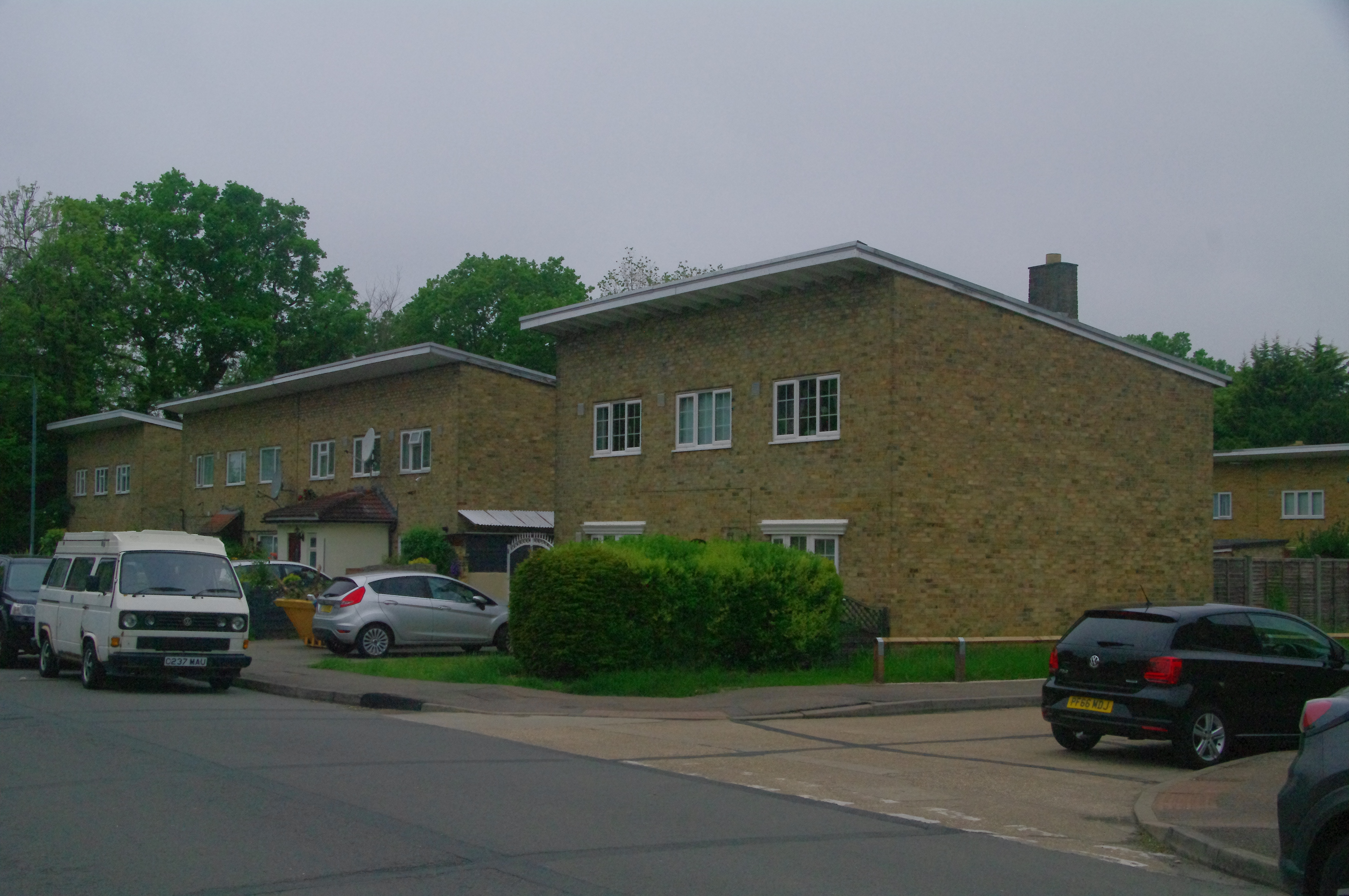
Detached houses in Ladyshot, Harlow, Essex

Penelope Whiting (1918 – 28 February 2017) was a British architect known for her contributions to post-war housing, urban planning and architectural writing in the United Kingdom.

== Early life and education ==
Whiting was born in 1918 in Newcastle upon Tyne. Her parents were Gerald Whiting, a naval architect and general manager of a shipbuilders, and Irene (née Stroud), a violinist. She studied architecture at the Architectural Association School of Architecture (AA) in London, graduating in 1942. Her education coincided with World War II, during which she also served as an ambulance driver and fire-watcher. She was one of the very few female professional architects at the time.

== Architectural career ==
After qualifying, Whiting joined the firm Yorke Rosenberg Mardall (YRM), where she worked with F. R. S. Yorke, a leading figure in British modernist architecture. Her early work focused on prefabricated housing for the Ministry of Works, designed to address the urgent postwar housing crisis. The Architectural Record (October 1945) also recorded her as a joint third-place prize winner in a competition to design a new sanatorium in Lucan, Co. Dublin, Ireland.

Whiting was involved in the planning and design of housing estates in Harlow New Town, Essex, including the Mark Hall and Ladyshot estates. These projects aimed to rehouse Londoners displaced by wartime bombing and slum clearance.

She played a key role in YRM's development in the mid-1950s of a new airport at Gatwick, designing the passenger bridge that connected the train station to the newly constructed terminal. She also contributed to the discussions surrounding the curtain wall design, which featured marbled clear glass by the artist Peggy Angus, evoking the appearance of reflected clouds.

After Yorke's death in 1962, Whiting left YRM and established her own architectural firm in west London, working mainly on the development of Southlands Training College in Wimbledon, including a library, teaching blocks and staff residence with its own bridge. This teacher training college has since been largely converted into flats after it merged with the University of Roehampton.

== Publications ==
- The New Small House (1953), with F. R. S. Yorke
- New Houses (1964)
- New Single-Storey Houses (1966)

== Personal life ==
Whiting married Trevor Hawkes, an engineer, in 1946. The couple had two children, Timothy and Amanda.

After his death in 1983, she retired as an architect and moved firstly to the Forest of Dean, and then Newnham on Severn. She died on 28 February 2017 at the age of 99.
