= Lucy Calista Morgan =

American teacher and weaver

- Born: September 20, 1889; Macon County, North Carolina, US
- Died: July 3, 1981 (aged 91); Webster, North Carolina, US
- Known for: Fiber art

Lucy Calista Morgan (1889–1981) was an American weaver and teacher. She is known for creating the cottage industry in North Carolina that would eventually become the Penland School of Craft. Morgan is considered an important part of the American Craft Revival that flourished in the first half of the 20th century.

== Biography ==
Morgan was born on September 20, 1889, in Macon County, North Carolina, one of nine children. She attended Central Michigan Normal School and Business Institute, graduating in 1915. She went on to teach in Michigan, Illinois, and Montana. For a time she was in Chicago, attending classes at the University of Chicago and working at the Children's Bureau of Chicago. While in Chicago Morgan learned about Hull House and the settlement movement.

In 1920 Morgan returned to North Carolina, where she took over supervision of the Appalachian Industrial School from her brother Rufus. She became interested in the traditional weaving in the area, inspired by a traditional Cat Track and Snail Trail pattern created by Susan Phillips. Morgan then took weaving classes at Berea College. While in Berea, North Carolina, Morgan purchased several looms, which were shipped to Penland. In the mid-1920s Morgan founded the Penland School of Handicraft, now the Penland School of Craft.

Morgan was a successful advocate of Appalachian crafts, adding pottery to the crafts produced. The crafts enjoyed good sales through the Great Depression. In 1933 Morgan organized an exhibition and sale at the Century of Progress World's Fair in Chicago. In 1934 Morgan represented the Southern Mountain Handicraft Guild at the International Exhibition of Folk Arts in Berne, Switzerland.

Morgan retired in 1962. She died on July 3, 1981, in Webster, North Carolina.
