= Penland School of Craft =

Historic building and craft school in Penland, North Carolina, US

- Penland School Historic District
- U.S. National Register of Historic Places
- U.S. Historic district
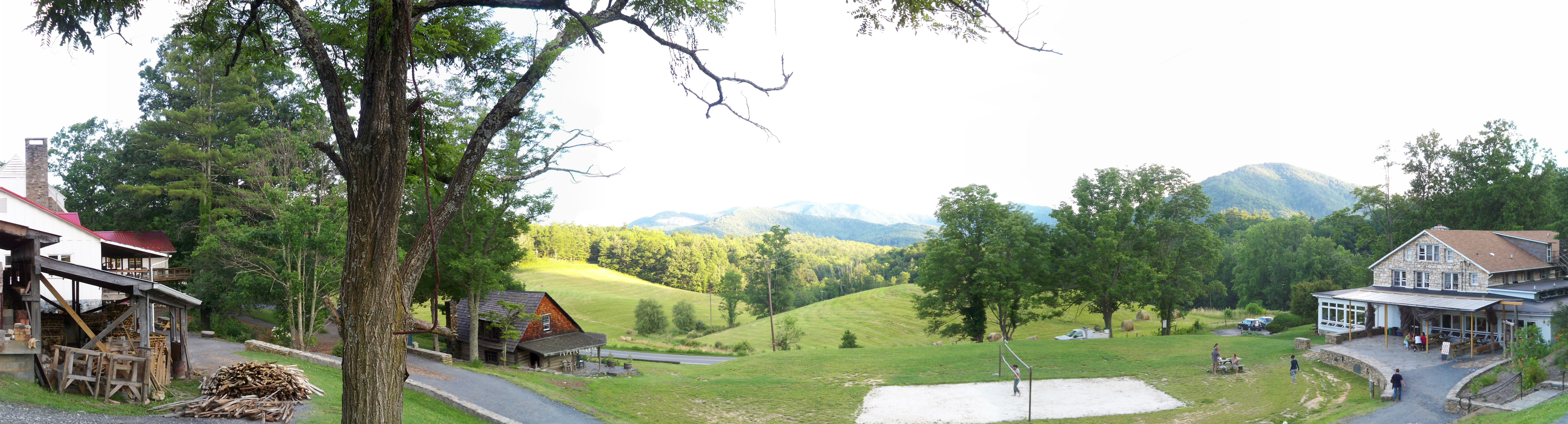
- Penland School of Craft panorama

- Location within North Carolina Location within the United States
- Location: NC 1164 (Conley Ridge Rd.), Penland, North Carolina
- Coordinates: 35°56′16″N 82°07′41.9″W
- Area: 115 acres (47 ha)
- Built: 1929
- Architect: Beeson, D.R.; Van Wageningen & Cothran
- Architectural style: Bungalow/craftsman, Colonial Revival, Rustic Revival
- NRHP reference No.: 03001270
- Added to NRHP: December 10, 2003

The Penland School of Craft ("Penland" and formerly "Penland School of Crafts") is an Arts and Crafts educational center located in the Blue Ridge Mountains in Penland, North Carolina, in the Snow Creek Township near Spruce Pine, about 50 miles from Asheville.

== History ==
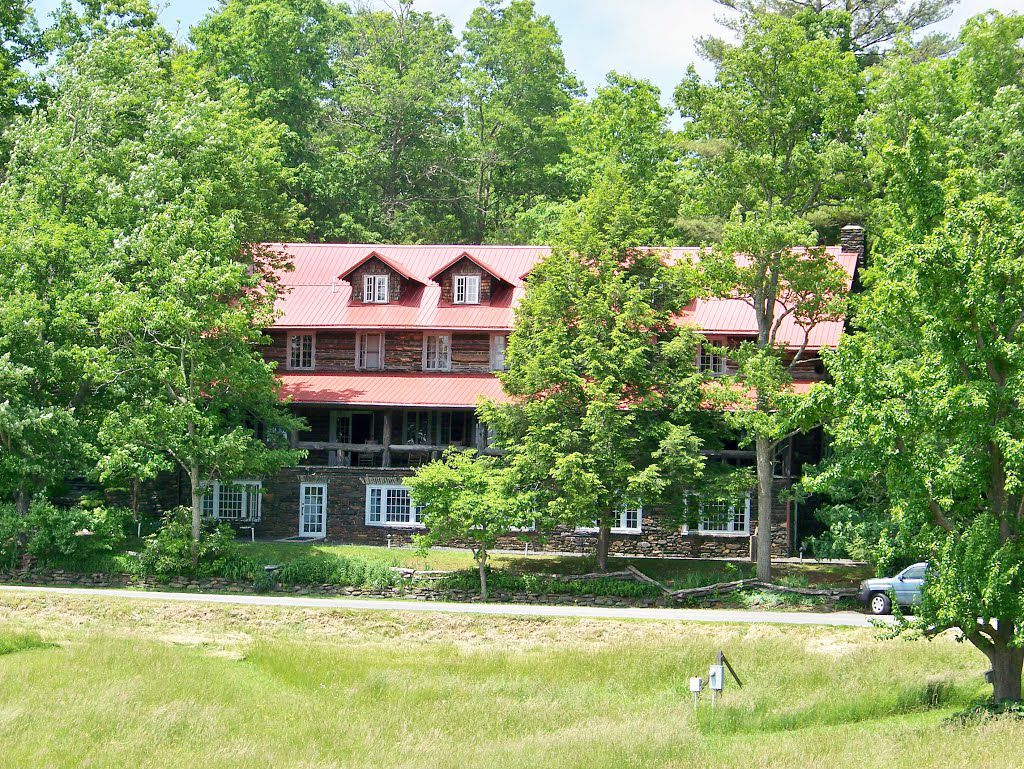
Craft House

The school was founded in the 1920s in the isolated mountain town of Penland, Mitchell County, NC. In 1923, Lucy Morgan (1889–1981), a teacher at the Appalachian School who had recently learned to weave at Berea College, created an association to teach the craft to local women so they could earn income from their homes. The center, called Penland Weavers and Potters, provided instruction, looms, and materials. Local volunteers built a cabin and then a larger hall. In 1929, Penland was officially founded as the Penland School of Handicrafts after Edward F. Worst, a weaving expert and author of the Foot Power Loom Weaving, visited the school to provide weaving instruction. Worst added classes in basketry and pottery.

Bill Brown, who took over in 1962 after Morgan, created a resident artist program and expanded the number and length of courses. There are 51 buildings on 400 acres. Penland buildings were designed primarily by North Carolinian architects, including Frank Harmon and Cannon Architects in Raleigh, North Carolina, and Dixon Weinstein Architects in Chapel Hill.

The school campus was added to the National Register of Historic Places in 2003 as the Penland School Historic District. The district encompasses 31 contributing buildings, one contributing site, and three contributing structures. The district is characterized by one- and two-story frame farmhouses dating from the turn of the 20th century, associated agricultural outbuildings, and Rustic Revival style log buildings. Notable buildings include the Colonial Revival-style Lily Loom House and Pines, the Craft Cabin, Honer Hall, Ridgeway, and Beacon Church.

== Overview ==
As of 2005, Penland offered Spring, Summer, and Fall workshops in craft disciplines, including weaving and dyeing, bead work, glassblowing, pottery, paper making, metalworking, and woodworking. It also offers fine arts subjects, such as printmaking, painting, and photography. Workshops are taught by visiting American and international artists and professors, a tradition that started with Worst and until he died in 1949. Academic degrees are not awarded by Penland, but students can receive college credit through Western Carolina University (WCU). There are about 1200 people who study at Penland each year.

Penland holds an annual Community Day in early March, when the school's studios are open and visitors can work on a small project with the help of the artists.

An exhibition of works created at Penland was held at the Mint Museum.
