= Cliff Tan =

Singaporean architect

Cliff Anlong Tan
- Born: 13 January 1988 (age 38); Singapore
- Education: Architectural Association School of Architecture
- Occupations: Architect, designer, author
- Notable work: Feng Shui Modern
- Website: www.dearmodern.com

Cliff Tan Anlong (born 13 January 1988) is a Singaporean architect, author, comedian and feng shui expert.

In 2016, he founded Dear Modern, a design firm based in London. Tan's independent project to revamp Singapore's Mass Rapid Transit map caught the eye of local media.

Tan creates educational and comedic content about feng shui, architecture, and interior design on his social media channels, Dear Modern, including TikTok, Instagram, and YouTube. In 2022, he authored his debut book Feng Shui Modern, which (as of 2024) has been translated into French, Dutch, Hebrew, and Spanish.In October 2026, his second book Feng Shui Fix It! became available.

Tan also was involved in Metaverse projects, including working with McDonald's to design their 2022 Lunar New Year Hall of Zodiacs pavilion alongside American designer Humberto Leon.
