= C. J. Lim =

C. J. Lim (born Chwen Jeng Lim; Chinese: 林陈正; 1964 in Malaysia) is the Academic Professor of Architecture and Urbanism at The Bartlett Faculty of the Built Environment at University College London (UCL); and served as Vice-Dean and Pro-Provost of University College London. He is the founder and director of CJ Lim Imaginarium, a creative academy, and Studio 8 Architects, a UK-based multidisciplinary and international practice in sustainable urban planning, architecture and landscape, focusing on interpretations of social, cultural and environmental programmes. Along with Simon Dickens and Bernd Felsinger (2006-2016), Lim leads PG Unit 10 within The Bartlett School of Architecture's Architecture MArch (ARB/RIBA Part 2) course.

Lim's research of cities is developed through a new urban paradigm – the 'Smartcity'. The work addresses what the spatial and phenomenological implications are when sustainable design is applied to a city and the role that citizens play in the production of a relevant social space. A central component of the Smartcity is the establishment of an ecological symbiosis between nature and built form to create diverse forms of resilient landscapes and urbanism including urban agriculture and beyond.

The Royal Institute of British Architects has awarded Lim the President's Medals International Teaching Awards for contribution to architectural education on four occasions (1999, 1998, 1998, 1997). In 2006, the Royal Academy of Arts London awarded him the Grand 'AJ/Bovis Lend Lease' Architecture Prize. He also won the Worshipful Company of Chartered Architects Award in 2006 and 2007.

He received his education at the Architectural Association School of Architecture (AA) in London.

== Selected bibliography ==
- Dreams + Disillusions (Routledge, 2024) CJ Lim and Luke Angers
- Once Upon A China (Routledge, 2021) CJ Lim and Steve McCloy
- Smartcities, Resilient Landscapes and Eco-warriors (Routledge, 2019) CJ Lim and Ed Liu
- Inhabitable Infrastructures: Science fiction or urban future? (Routledge, 2017) CJ Lim
- Food City (Routledge, 2014) CJ Lim
- Short Stories: London in two-and-a-half dimensions (Routledge, 2011) CJ Lim and Ed Liu
- Smartcities + Eco-warriors (Routledge, 2010) CJ Lim and Ed Liu
- Virtually Venice (The British Council, 2006) CJ Lim
- Neo Architecture: CJ Lim (Images Publishing Australia, 2005)
- Devices (Architectural Press Elsevier, 2005; Routledge, 2013) CJ Lim (ed.)
- Museums [work in process] (Glasgow School of Art Press, 2004) CJ Lim
- How Green is your Garden? (Wiley Academy UK + USA, 2003) CJ Lim and Ed Liu
- Realms of Impossibility: Air (Wiley Academy, 2002) CJ Lim and Ed Liu (eds.)
- Realms of Impossibility: Water (Wiley Academy, 2002) CJ Lim and Ed Liu (eds.)
- Realms of Impossibility: Ground (Wiley Academy, 2002) CJ Lim and Ed Liu (eds.)
- Sins + Other Spatial Relatives (Ind-E 8 Publishing London, 2000) CJ Lim
- 441/10...We'll Reconfigure The Space When You're Ready (Ind-E 8 Publishing London, 1996) CJ Lim
