= Achim Menges =

Achim Menges (born 1975 in Mannheim) is a German architect and university professor. He leads the Institute for Computational Design and Construction at the University of Stuttgart.

== Life ==
Menges studied architecture at the Technical University of Darmstadt and at the Architectural Association in London. He was then unit master at the Diploma School and studio master in the Emergent Technologies and Design Graduate Programme at the Architectural Association. After a professorship at the HfG Offenbach, he was appointed to the University of Stuttgart in 2008, where he founded the Institute for Computational Design and Construction (ICD). From 2009 to 2015, he was also a visiting professor at the Harvard Graduate School of Design. Menges has been Vice Dean for Research at the Faculty of Architecture and Urban Planning since 2017 and spokesperson for the DFG-Cluster of Excellence EXC 2120 Integrative Computational Design and Construction for Architecture (IntCDC) since 2019.

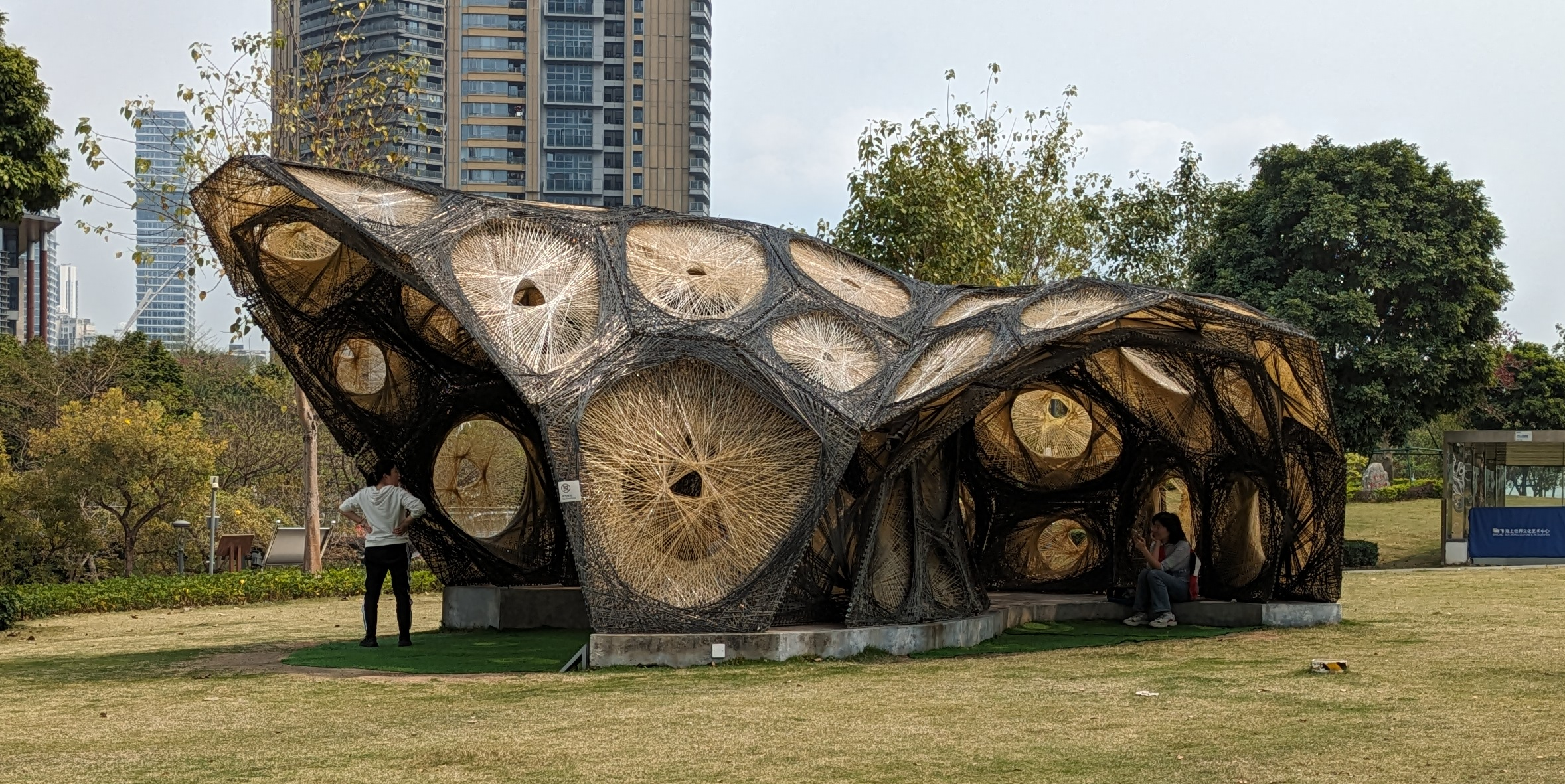
ICD/ITKE Research Pavilion in Shenzhen, China

At the ICD, Menges is researching innovative, sustainable construction methods that are made possible by digital planning methods and robotic fabrication processes. The aim is to be able to build significantly faster with significantly less material in the future while understanding technological innovations in construction as an opportunity for more liveable and high-quality architecture. With his research work in this area he became known internationally and has significantly increased the visibility of the Department of Architecture at the University of Stuttgart. According to a Stanford/Elsevier study, he was the second most cited researcher in the field of architecture worldwide in 2022. In 2023, he was the first architect to receive the Gottfried Wilhelm Leibniz-Prize.

== Projects ==
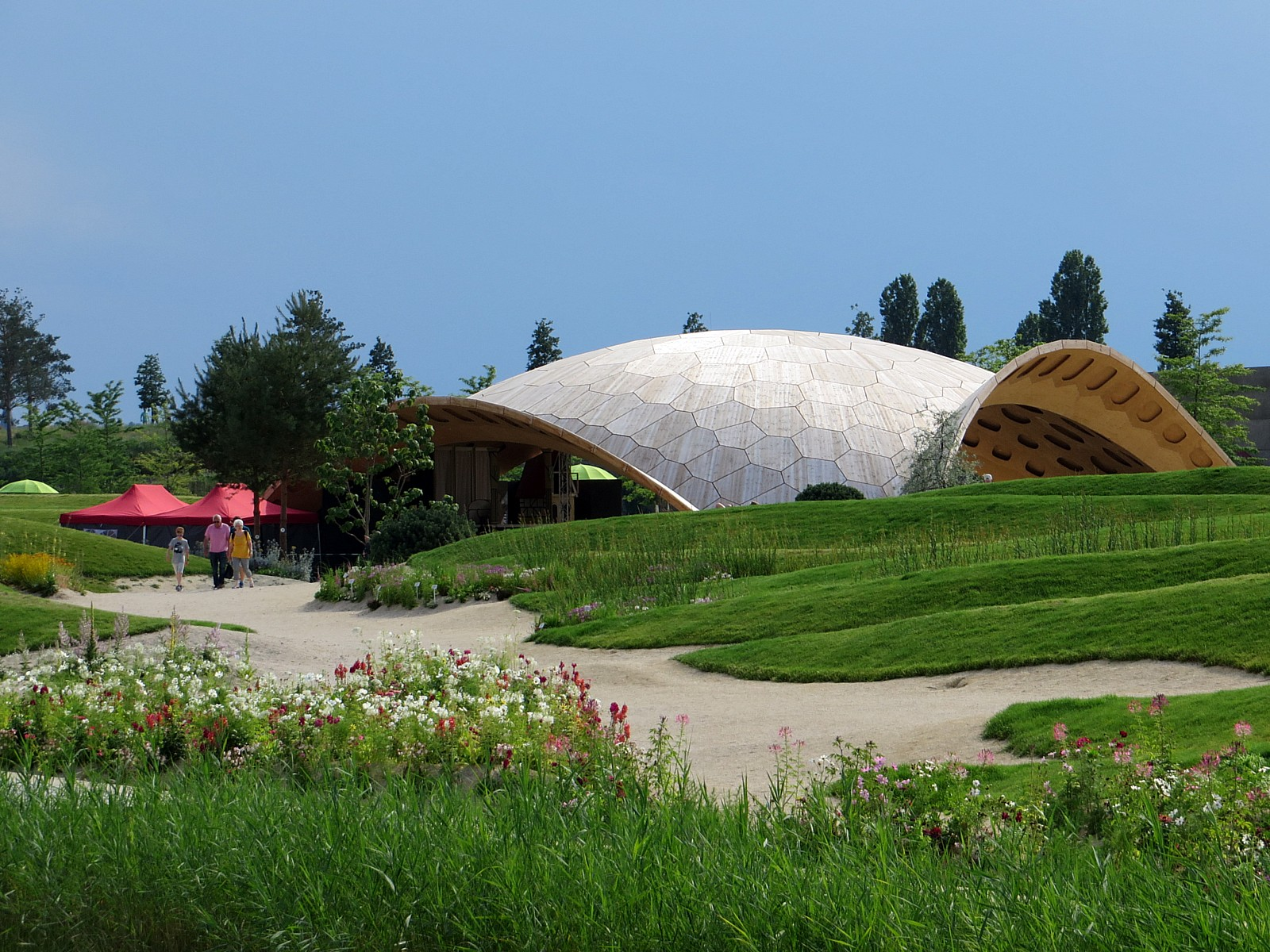
Achim Menges: Bionic Timber Pavilion 2019 in Heilbronn

His most important projects include the Maison Fibre installation at the 2021 Venice Architecture Biennale, two pavilions for the 2019 Federal Horticultural Show in Heilbronn, the 2019 Urbach Tower, the 2016 Elytra Pavillon at the Victoria and Albert Museum in London and the 2014 Forest Exhibition Pavilion in Schwäbisch Gmünd.

== Selected publications ==
- Achim Menges, Sean Ahlquist. (Hrsg.): Computational Design Thinking. John Wiley & Sons, London 2011, ISBN 978-0-470-66570-1.
- Achim Menges (Hrsg.): Systemisches Denken und Integrales Entwerfen. System Thinking and Integral Design. Hochschulverlag HFG Offenbach, Offenbach 2008, ISBN 978-3-921997-69-7.
- Achim Menges (Hrsg.): Material Computation. Higher Integration in Morphogenetic Design. (= Architectural Design, Vol. 82, No. 2.) Wiley Academy, London 2012, ISBN 978-0-470-97330-1.
- Achim Menges (Hrsg.): Material Synthesis. Fusing the Physical and the Computational. (= Architectural Design, Vol. 85, No. 5.) Wiley Academy, London 2015, ISBN 978-1-118-87837-8.
- Achim Menges, Tobias Schwinn, Oliver David Krieg (Hrsg.): Advancing Wood Architecture. A Computational Approach. Routledge, Oxford, ISBN 978-1-138-93299-9.
- Achim Menges, Jan Knippers: Architektur, Forschung, Bauen. ICD/ITKE 2010-2020. Birkhäuser Verlag, Basel 2021, ISBN 978-3-0356-2036-8. (auch auf englisch erschienen: Architecture, Research, Building)
