= GSW Headquarters =

High-rise building in Berlin

- GSW-Hochhaus
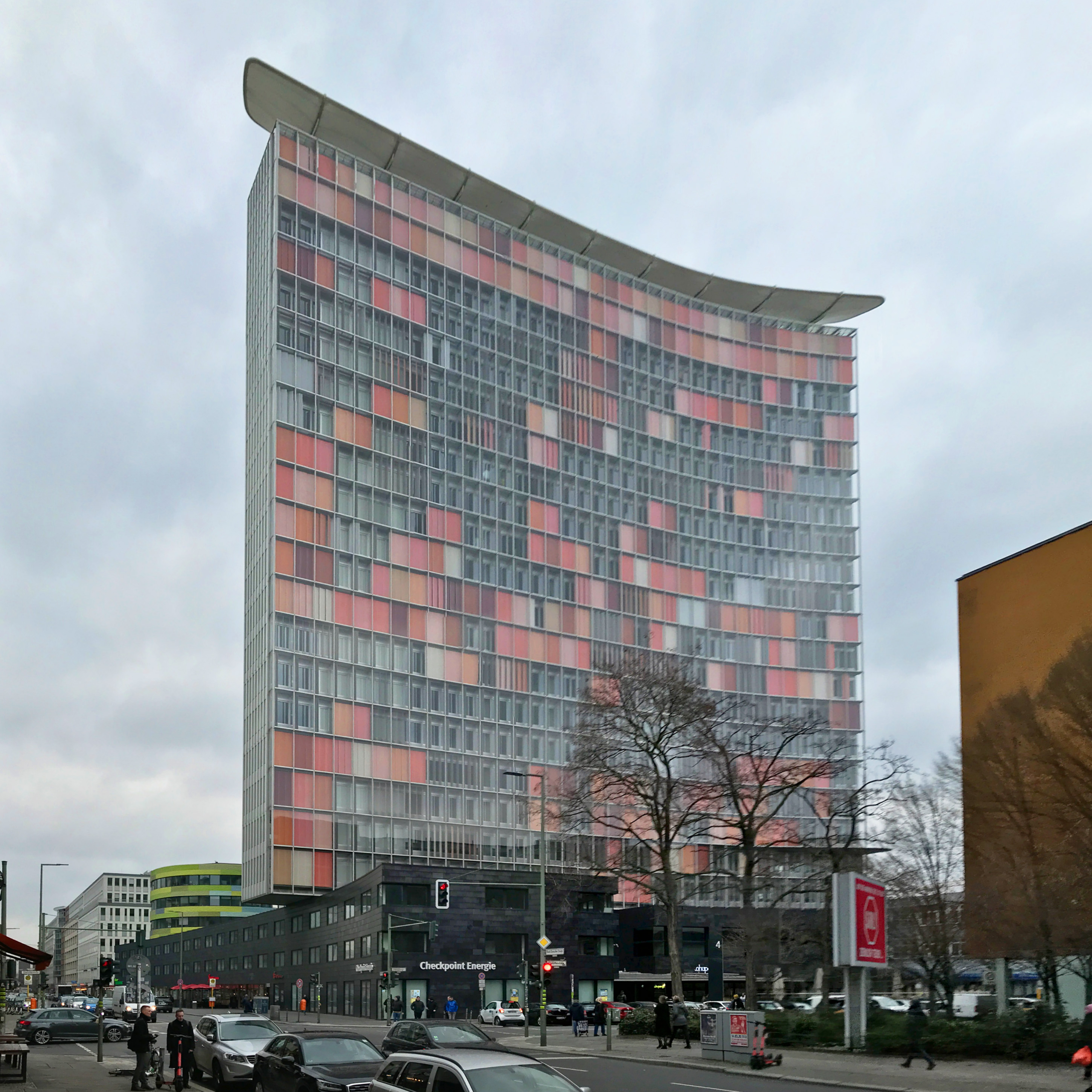
- West facade, viewed from Rudi-Dutschke-Straße, 2020
- Interactive map of the GSW Headquarters area
- Alternative names: Rocket-Tower

General information
- Status: Completed
- Type: Office, retail
- Architectural style: High-tech architecture
- Location: Kreuzberg, Berlin, Germany
- Coordinates: 52°30′23.39″N 13°23′34.99″E
- Current tenants: Rocket Internet
- Construction started: 1995
- Completed: 1999
- Opened: 1999

Height
- Height: 81.5 m (267 ft)

Technical details
- Floor count: 22

Design and construction
- Architects: Matthias Sauerbruch, Louisa Hutton, Juan Lucas Young, Jens Ludloff, Brian Lilley, Philip Engelbrecht, Anna Bader-Hardt, Govert Gerritsen, Moritz Theden
- Architecture firm: Sauerbruch Hutton
- Structural engineer: Arup

GSW Headquarters (since 2017: Rocket-Tower) is a high-rise office building in the district of Berlin-Kreuzberg. Construction commenced in 1995 and was completed in 1999. The building is 81.5 m (267 ft) high and provides 24,500 m^{2} of floor space for offices and shops. The GSW Headquarters 1990s extension tower was designed by Sauerbruch Hutton architects.

== Planning and construction ==
In 1991, a limited architectural competition was launched to expand the offices for Berlin's largest social housing association, GSW. At this time, GSW was owned and operated by the City of Berlin. (GSW has been sold off and privatized since and is named GSW Immobilien today.) The architectural competition was a joint effort by GSW, the Kreuzberg district administration and the Berlin Senate. Sauerbruch Hutton architects were awarded the first prize and the contract to design the building.

The design is notable for extending the existing 1950s office tower by a second tower of similar height. The 1990s extension tower is a relatively thin slab building with a gentle curve – concave to the west, convex to the east. The thin and curved high-rise accounts only for one part of the extension. Other parts are a low-rise building along Rudi-Dutschke-Straße and a rounded office building on the corner of Charlottenstraße. This cylindrical part of the ensemble is named "Pillbox".

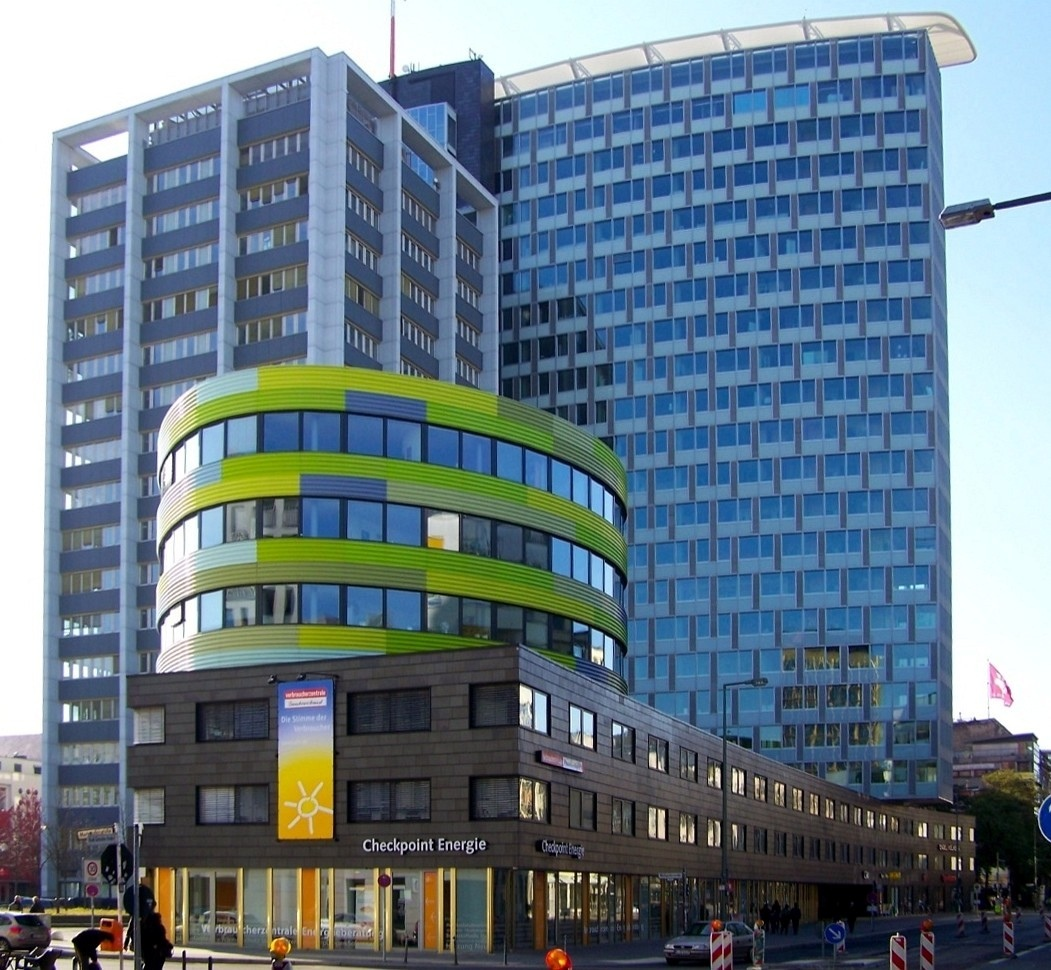
View from the east shows the integration of the 1950s office tower with the new high rise in the background and the so-called "Pillbox" in front.

The GSW Headquarters has double skinned façades – the one on the west being a one-metre thick convection façade that, in combination with the workings of the 'flying roof', enables natural ventilation for the offices. Further, the system of blinds on the west façade play an important role in controlling solar gains and so reducing the use of artificial heating and cooling. The setup is able to provide a good level of comfort as well as a 40% reduction in energy consumption. Polychromy was a key feature of the blinds. Vertical louvres in red, pink and orange can be rotated in response to levels of sunshine. A computerized regulation system controls the movement of the aluminium louvres for each window individually. This results in a constantly changing appearance. In full sunlight, the western façade appears as a colorful and bright mosaic. In cloudy conditions or darkness, the sun shades open up completely and the building appears to be all glass.

== Recognition ==
The building was universally praised and awarded with numerous prizes. It was nominated for a Stirling Prize and the European Union Prize for Contemporary Architecture. Architecture literature and press keep pointing out the relevance of the colorful and innovative façade design. Fiona McLachlan: "It is a highly significant building and can be considered to have spawned numerous polychromatic derivatives." Drawings and an architectural model were acquired by the New York Museum of Modern Art.

== Use and ownership ==
The State of Berlin sold GSW in 2004. GSW was converted into a privately owned real-estate company. GSW Immobilien then sold the building complex in Kreuzberg. It then rented the office space for the following ten years. After GSW moving out, Rocket Internet became the main tenant. The official name since 2017 is Rocket-Tower. But still, the building is mostly called GSW-Hochhaus by the public.

== Public campaign to preserve the original design ==
After it became public that the new owner is planning to replace the original louvres with conventional roller blinds, Matthias Sauerbruch, Louisa Hutton and Juan Lucas Young petitioned to preserve the original design. Their public campaign received media attention in Germany. Supporters are, among others: Olafur Eliasson, Katharina Grosse, Daniel Libeskind, HG Merz, Kristin Feireiss, Kees Christiaanse, Karin Sander, Jean-Louis Cohen, and Barry Bergdoll.
