= Architectural Association School of Architecture =

Architecture school in London, England

Coordinates: 51°31′07″N 0°07′52″W

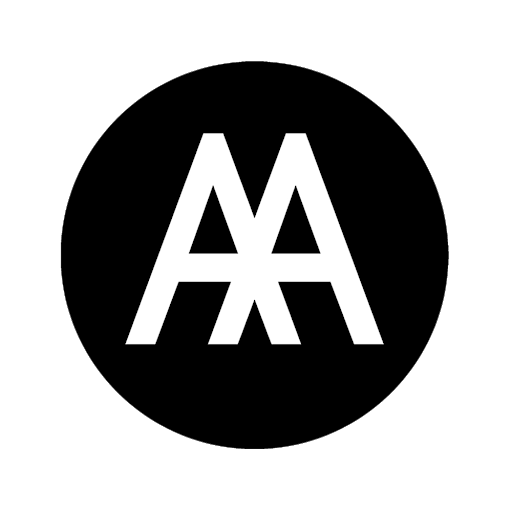
- Motto: Design with Beauty, Build in Truth
- Type: Independent
- Established: 1847; 179 years ago
- President: Ravin Ponniah
- Director: Ingrid Schroder (from August 2022)
- Undergraduates: 562 (2023)
- Postgraduates: 361 (2023)
- Location: London (main), United Kingdom
- Website: aaschool.ac.uk
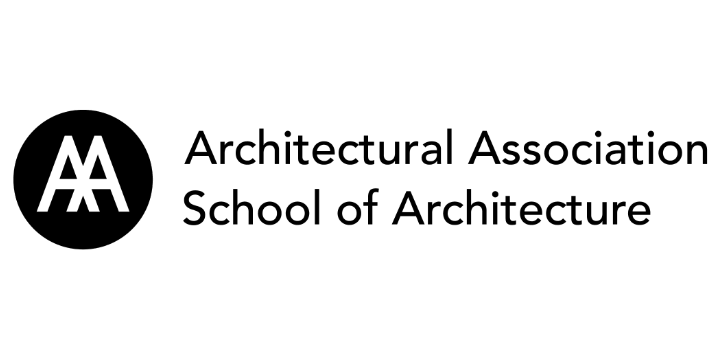

The Architectural Association School of Architecture in London, commonly referred to as the AA, is the oldest private school of architecture in the UK. The AA hosts exhibitions, lectures, symposia and publications.

== History ==
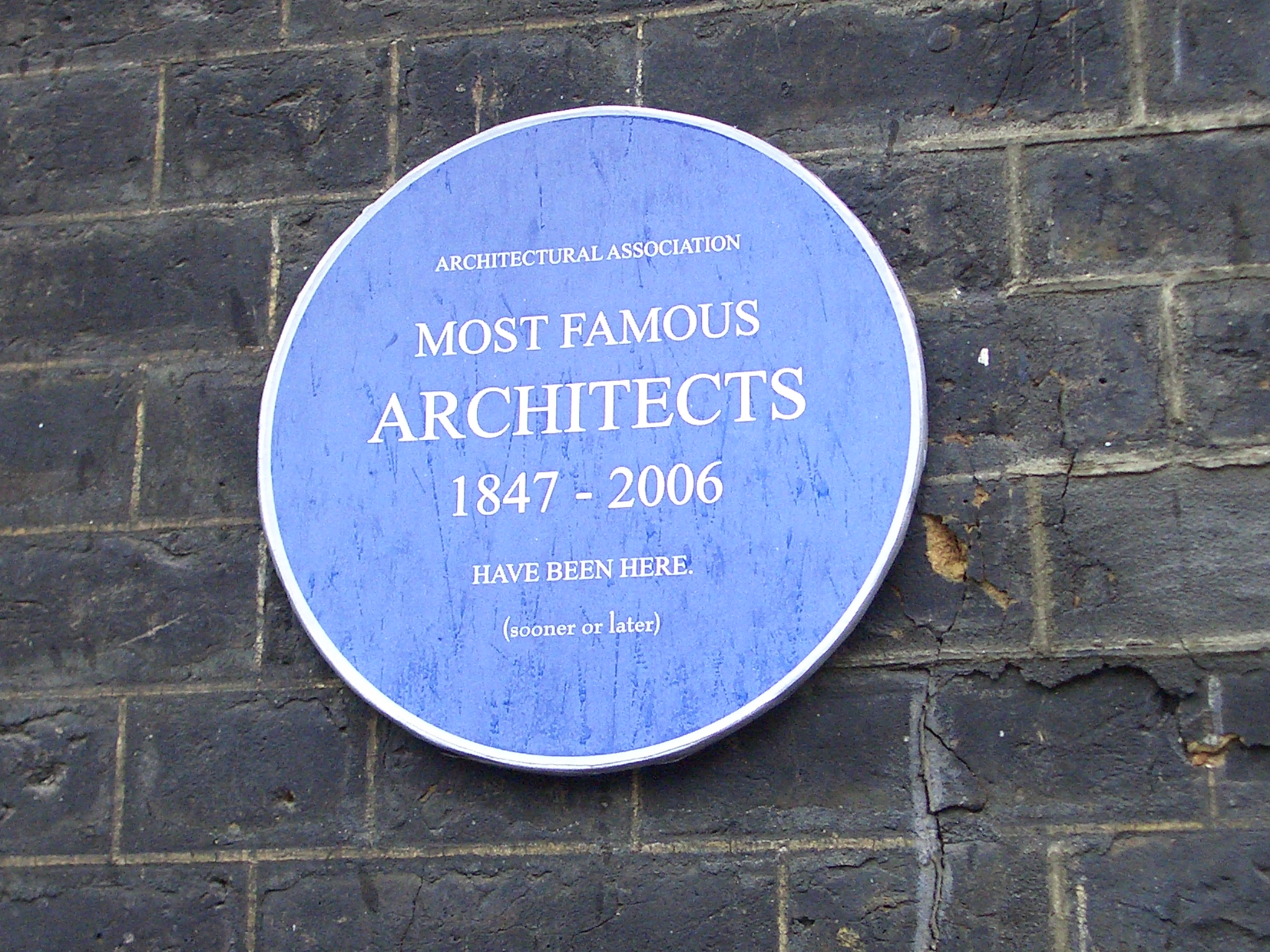
Plaque beside entrance

The Architectural Association was founded in 1847 as an alternative to the practice of training young men via apprenticeship to established architects. Apprenticeships offered no guarantee of educational quality or professional standards, and the system was believed to be "rife with vested interests and open to abuse, dishonesty and incompetence".

Two articled pupils, Robert Kerr (1823–1904) and Charles Gray (1827/28–1881), proposed a systematic course of training provided by the students themselves. Following a merger with the Association of Architectural Draughtsmen, the first formal meeting under the name of the Architectural Association took place in May 1847 at Lyons Inn Hall, London. Kerr became the first president (1847–48). From 1859, the AA shared premises at 9 Conduit Street with the Royal Institute of British Architects, later (1891) renting rooms in Great Marlborough Street.

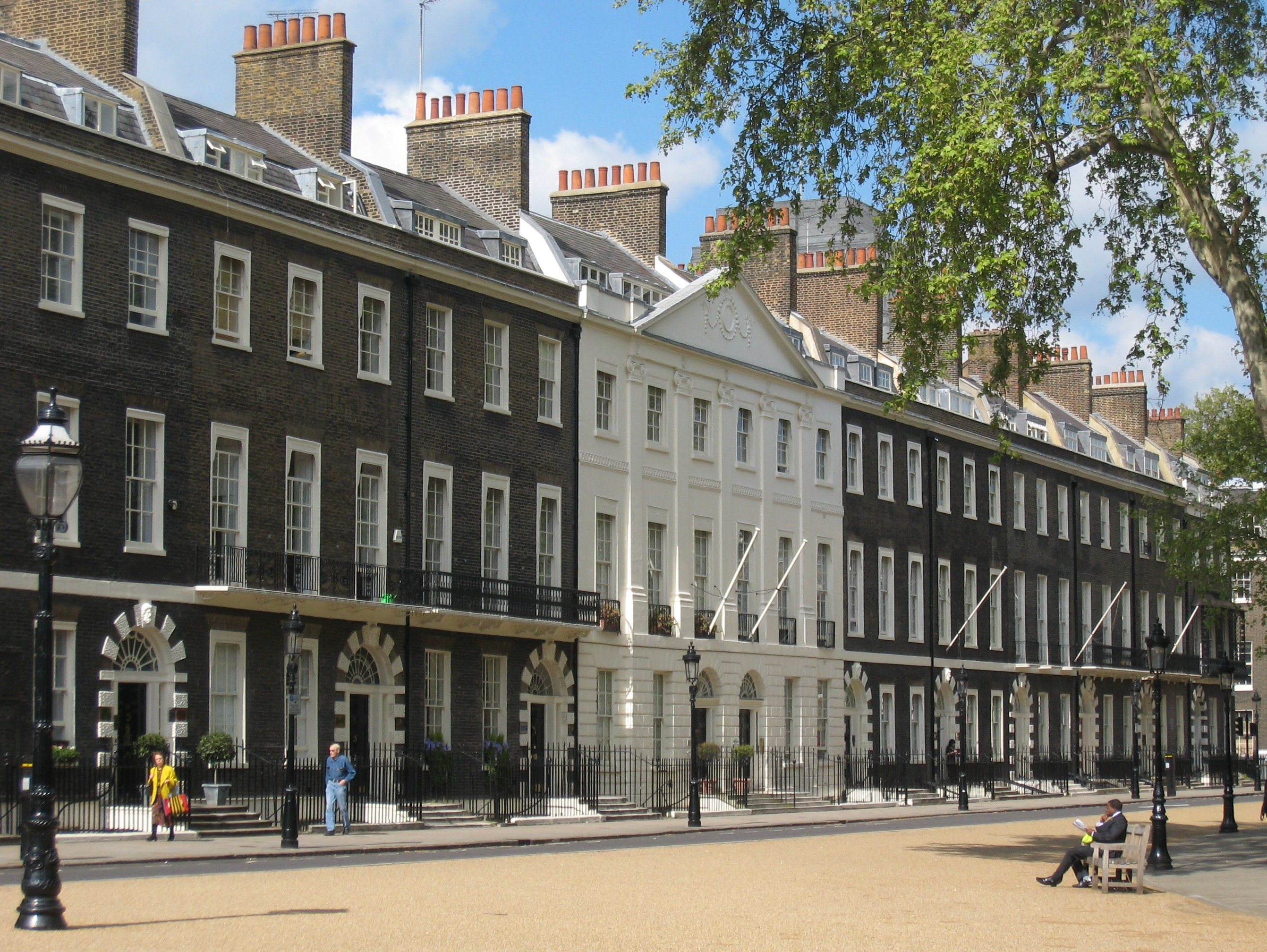
AA Bedford Square premises

The AA School was formally established in 1890, and in 1901, it moved to the former Royal Architectural Museum in Tufton Street, Westminster. In 1917, it moved to its current location in Bedford Square, central London, and has since acquired additional London premises in John Street, a property on Morwell Street behind Bedford Square, and a 350-acre (1.4 km^{2}) site at Hooke Park in Dorset.

Historically, students of the AA have been addressed by John Ruskin and George Gilbert Scott in the 19th century, and, more recently, by Richard Rogers, Zaha Hadid, Rem Koolhaas, Denise Scott Brown, and David Chipperfield, an alumnus of the school.

=== Women at the AA ===
Women were first admitted as students to the AA School during World War I in 1917, almost 20 years after the RIBA had admitted its first female member, Ethel Charles, who, with her sister Bessie, had been refused entry to the AA school in 1893. Ruth Gollancz, Winifred Ryle, Irene Graves and Gillian Harrison (nee Cooke) were some of the first women to enter the AA, hitherto a solely male school.

In the post World War II period, several women architects, writers, and journalists attended courses ("classes and sets") at the AA, including Su Brumwell (Susan Miller / Rogers), Eldred Evans, Margot Griffin, Zaha Hadid, Patti Hopkins, Samantha Hardingham, Sally Mackereth, Mya Anastasia Manakides, Janet Street-Porter, Carolyn Trevor, Susan Wheeler and Georgie Walton.

The position of women at the AA was highlighted and investigated during a year-long programme of celebration in 2017, AAXX, marking the centenary of the first women's entry to the school. A book, AA Women in Architecture 1917–2017, edited by Elizabeth Darling and Lynne Walker, was published.

== Curriculum ==
Courses are divided into two main areas: undergraduate programmes, leading to the AA Diploma (RIBA/ARB Part 2), and postgraduate programmes, which include specialised courses in Landscape Urbanism, Housing and Urbanism, Sustainable Environmental Design, Histories and Theories, Emergent Technologies, and Design Research Lab. Other programmes include Projective Cities, Design + Make, and Interprofessional studio. Since its foundation, the school has continued to draw its teaching staff from progressive international practices. Teaching staff are reappointed annually, allowing a continual renewal of the exploration of architectural graphics and polemical formalism.

=== Independent status ===
The school sits outside the state-funded university system and UCAS application system. As an independent school, the AA does not participate in university rankings. Until 2015 when the London School of Architecture was founded, it was the only independent architecture school in the UK.

The AA enrolls a higher proportion of students from overseas compared to other architecture schools in the UK.

== Bookshop and publications ==
The AA Bookshop has a collection of architectural literature and is a platform for AA's own publications. AA Publications has a tradition of publishing architects, artists and theorists early in their careers, as well as occasionally publishing figures who have already gained renown in other fields of expertise, such as Salman Rushdie. AA Publications produces the journal, AA Files, and the AA Book, known as the Projects Review, which annually documents the work undertaken by members of the school from Foundation to Graduate programmes. AA publications are designed and edited by the AA Print Studio, originally established in 1971 as part of the Communications Unit directed by Dennis Crompton of Archigram. The school formerly had its own independent radio station.

== Controversies ==
The AA has a unique democratic structure where staff and students elect a director and a majority of the members of the governing board.

In November 2017, the AA reportedly planned to make 16 staff redundant, including the whole of its publications and exhibitions departments. Shortly before, the AA had announced it was seeking a new director, to be appointed by March 2018, following the departure of Brett Steele announced in December 2016.

The first female director of the AA was Eva Franch i Gilabert, appointed in 2018 (succeeding interim director Samantha Hardingham). Following votes of no confidence in her leadership, Franch was fired in July 2020 for "failure to develop and implement a strategy and maintain the confidence of the AA School Community, which were specific failures of performance against clear objectives outlined in the original contract of employment." Her dismissal came despite support from academics who wrote an open letter talking of "systemic biases" against women and of sexism, and accusing the AA of using "the pandemic for anti-democratic purposes". Architectural magazine Dezeen reported that tutor and alumni views indicated that the failure to investigate allegations of bullying and sexism had damaged both the AA school and the architecture profession, leaving "a cloud over the school". The AA began seeking a successor to Franch in December 2021, shortlisting candidates in March 2022. In May 2022, the school announced Ingrid Schroder would be its new director from August 2022.

== Gallery ==
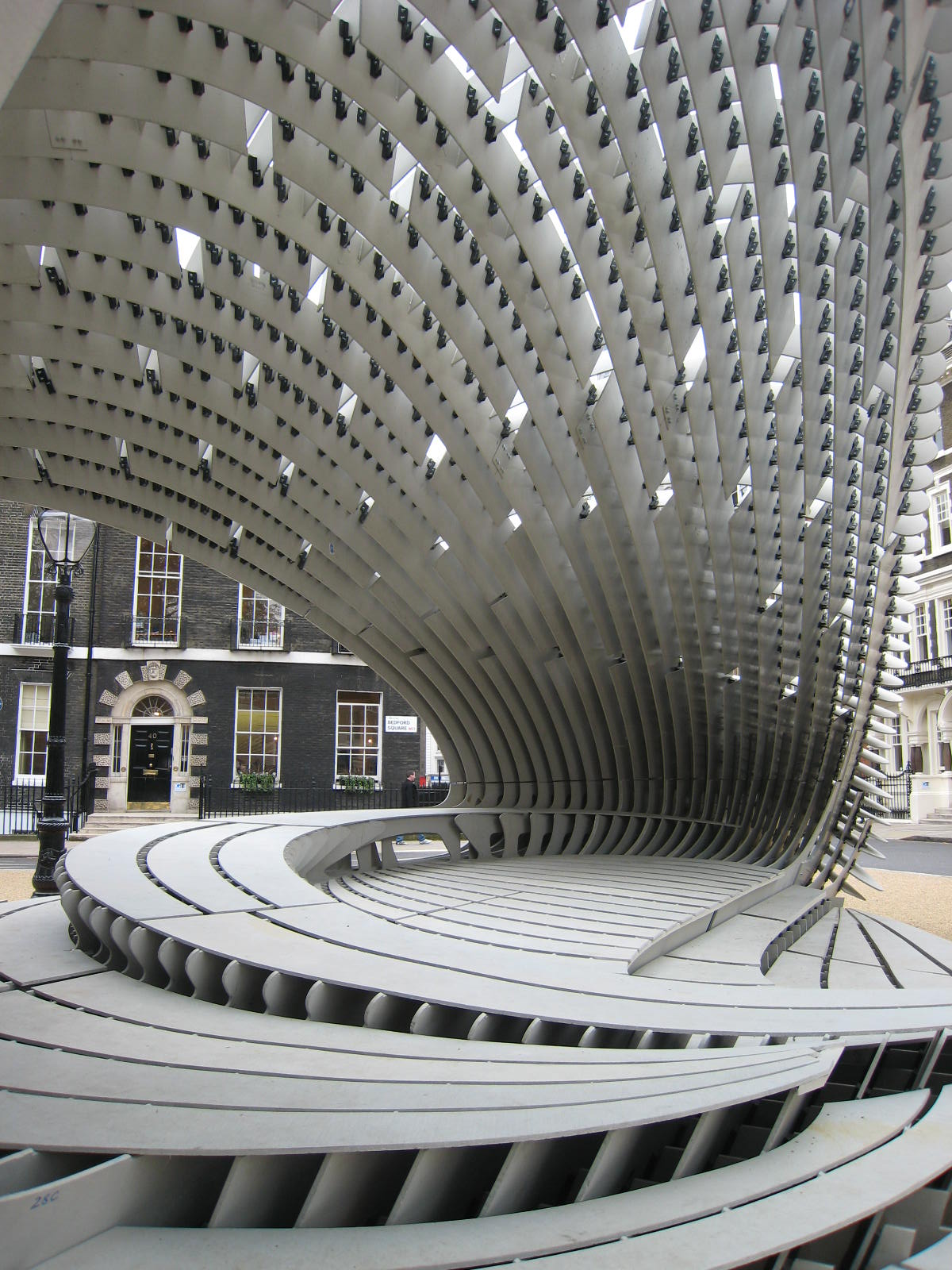
DRL10 Pavilion

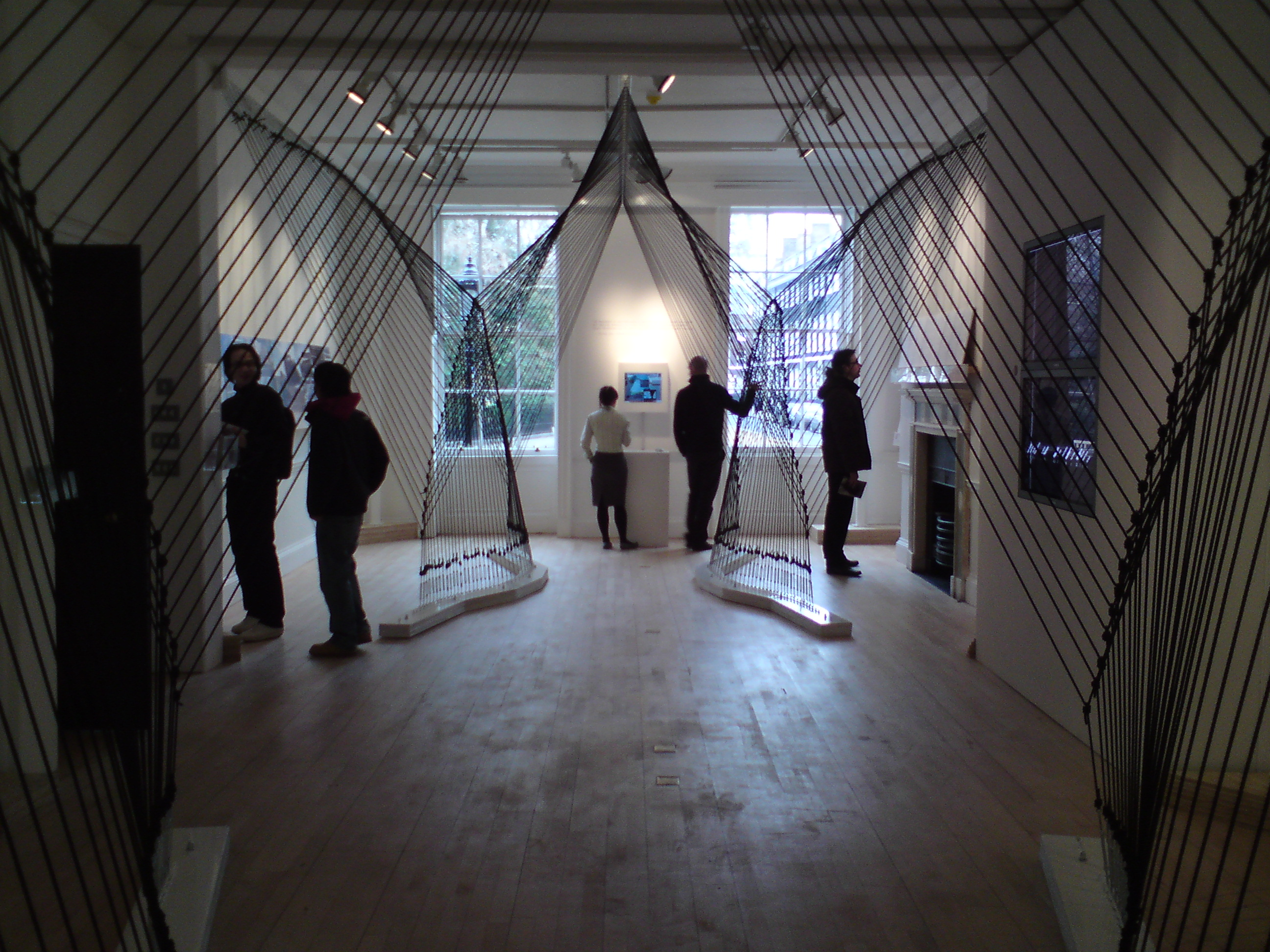
AA Gallery

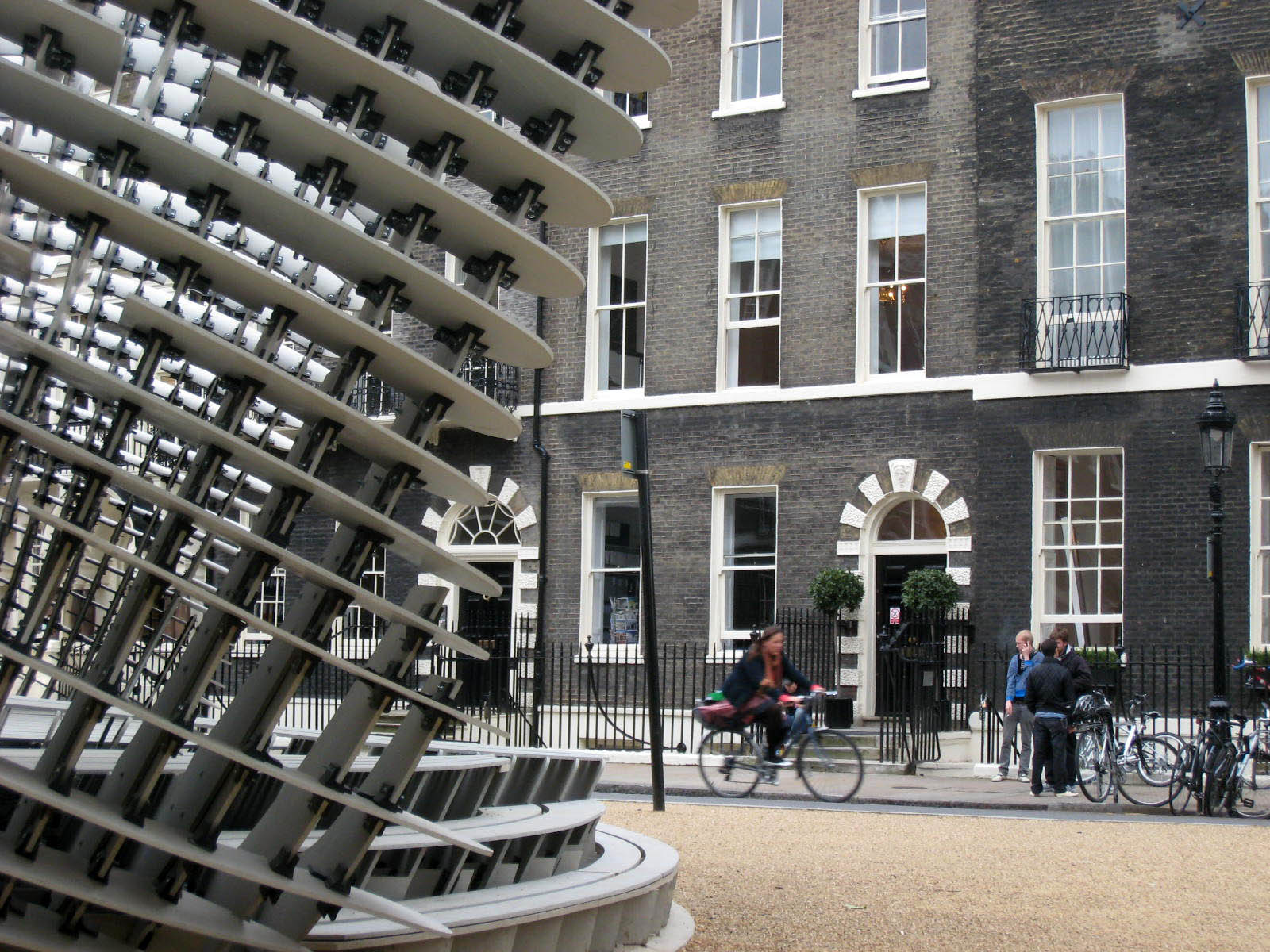
Architectural Association School of Architecture

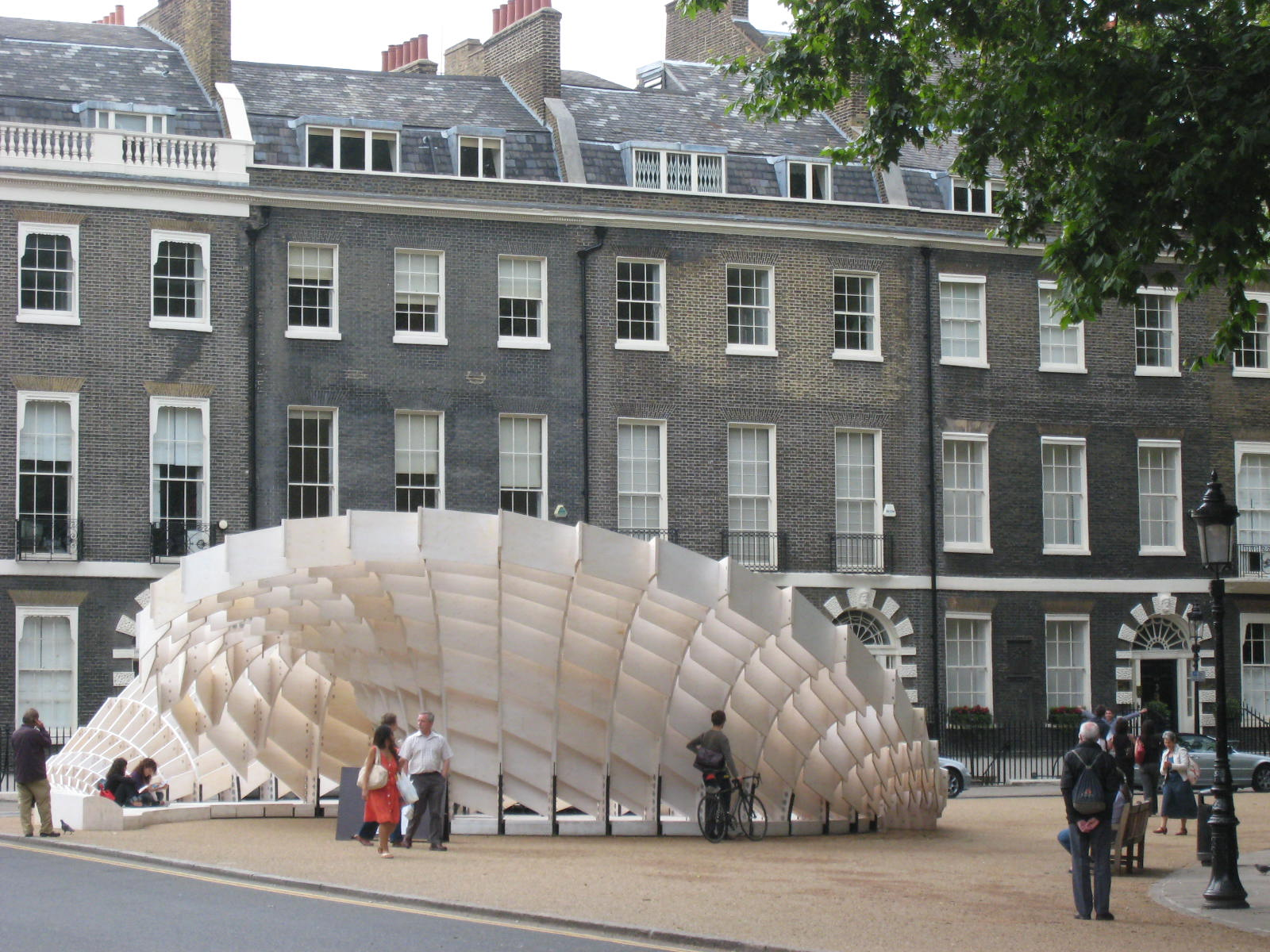
AA Intermediate Unit 2 'Swoosh' pavilion, 2008

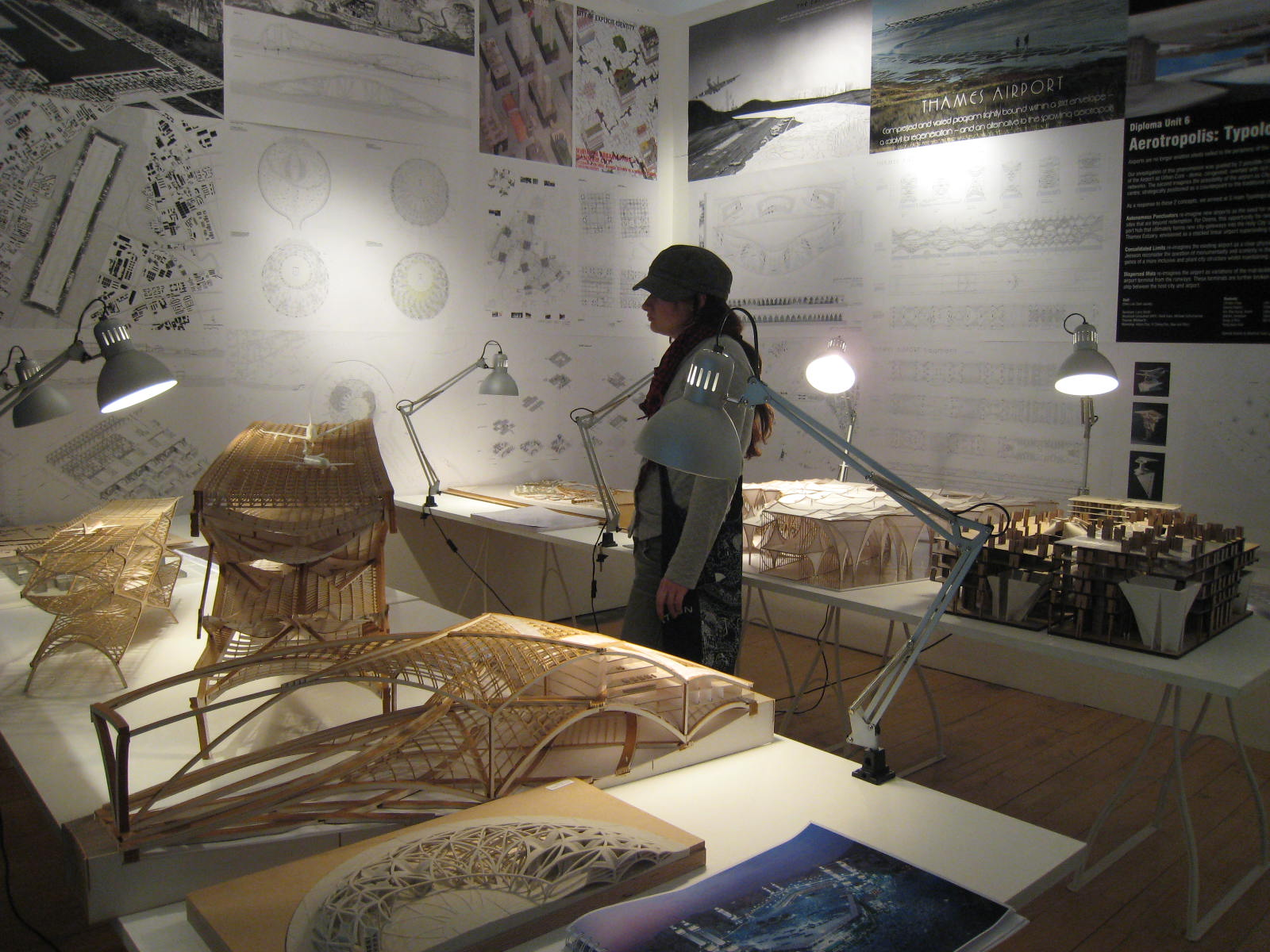
Inside the AA

== Notable alumni ==
- Will Alsop (Stirling Prize, 2000)
- Stanley Amis (1924–2021)
- Ron Arad
- Herbert Baker
- Geoffrey Bawa
- Elisabeth Benjamin
- Ben van Berkel
- Susanne Bier
- Christopher Bowerbank
- Margaret Justin Blanco White
- Peter Blundell Jones
- Habib Fida Ali (architect) 1935-2017 (Sitara-i-Imtiaz, 2017)
- Neave Brown (RIBA Royal Gold Medal 2018)
- John Dixon Butler
- Elizabeth Chesterton
- David Chipperfield (Stirling Prize, 2007)
- Nigel Coates
- Sir Peter Cook
- Edward Cullinan
- Minnette De Silva
- Carmen Dillon
- Jeremy Dixon
- Sir Philip Dowson
- Jane Drew
- Frank Duffy
- Eldred Evans
- Robin Evans
- Kathryn Findlay
- Mark Fisher
- Kenneth Frampton
- John Frazer
- Tony Fretton
- Stephen Gardiner
- Ranulph Glanville
- Marco Goldschmied
- Ruth Gollancz
- Hansjörg Göritz (Kunstpreis Berlin Baukunst, 1996; American Academy in Rome Affiliated Fellow, 2013)
- Piers Gough
- Johnny Grey
- Sir Nicholas Grimshaw
- Zaha Hadid (Pritzker Prize, 2004; Stirling Prize, 2010, 2011)
- Timothy Han
- Thomas Hardy
- Frank Harmon
- Gillian Harrison
- Fergus Henderson
- Manuel Herz
- Jonathan Hill
- Steven Holl
- Michael Hopkins
- Patty Hopkins
- Bill Howell (1922–1974)
- Gillian Howell (1927–2000)
- Dorothy Hughes
- Maxwell Hutchinson
- Louisa Hutton
- A. R. Hye
- Mazharul Islam
- Sir Geoffrey Jellicoe
- Edward Jones
- Robert Furneaux Jordan
- Gerhard Kallmann
- Shiu-Kay Kan
- Ram Karmi (Israel Prize, 2002)
- Ada Karmi-Melamede (Israel Prize, 2007)
- Rem Koolhaas (Pritzker Prize, 2000)
- Denys Lasdun
- Judith Ledeboer
- Steffen Lehmann
- Amanda Levete
- C.J. Lim
- Edward Prentice Mawson
- Ann MacEwen
- Sally Mackereth
- James MacLaren
- Bruce Martin
- Mary Medd
- Achim Menges
- Edna Mosley
- Mohsen Mostafavi
- Alan E. Munby
- Herbert Muschamp
- Frei Otto
- Nicolai Ouroussoff
- Neri Oxman
- John Pawson
- John Penn
- Marian Pepler
- Philip Powell
- Janet Street-Porter
- Cedric Price
- Keith Raywood
- Raj Rewal
- Richard Rogers (Pritzker Prize, 2007; Stirling Prize, 2006, 2009)
- Diana Rowntree
- Winifred Ryle
- Elisabeth Sakellariou
- Peter Salter
- Matthias Sauerbruch
- Ole Scheeren
- Elisabeth Scott
- Denise Scott Brown
- Nasrine Seraji
- Dennis Sharp
- Cliff Tan
- William Tatton Brown
- Quinlan Terry
- John F. C. Turner
- Jaqueline Tyrwhitt
- Michael Ventris
- Eyal Weizman
- Roger Westman
- Penelope Whiting (1918–2017)
- Clive Wilkinson
- Nicholas Williams
- John Winter
- John Worthington
- Roger Zogolovitch

== Former directors ==
- Howard Robertson (1929–35)
- Alvin Boyarsky (1971–90)
- Alan Balfour (1991–95)
- Mohsen Mostafavi (1995–2004)
- Brett Steele (2005–2017)
- Samantha Hardingham (interim, 2017–18)
- Eva Franch i Gilabert (2018–2020)

== Notable current and former teachers ==
- Abalos & Herreros
- Virgil Abloh
- Charles Jencks
- David Adjaye
- Will Alsop
- Wiel Arets
- Ben van Berkel
- David Bernstein
- Tatiana Bilbao
- Alison Brooks
- Reg Butler
- Nigel Coates
- Mark Cousins
- Keith Critchlow
- Robin Evans
- David Greene
- Terry Farrell
- Jane Hughes Fawcett
- Mark Fisher
- Earl Flansburgh
- John Frazer
- Ranulph Glanville
- Mike Gold
- James Gowan
- Zaha Hadid
- Charles Hutton
- Louisa Hutton
- Robert Furneaux Jordan
- Jeff Kipnis
- Leon Krier
- Rem Koolhaas
- Arthur Korn
- Daniel Libeskind
- Achim Menges
- Mohsen Mostafavi
- Farshid Moussavi
- Gordon Pask
- Alberto Pérez-Gómez
- Cedric Price
- Philippe Rahm
- Jasia Reichardt
- Ian Ritchie
- Nathalie Rozencwajg
- Makoto Saito
- Peter Salter
- Matthias Sauerbruch
- Patrik Schumacher
- Nasrine Seraji
- Dennis Sharp
- Bahram Shirdel
- Peter Smithson
- Summerson, John
- John F. C. Turner
- Bernard Tschumi
- Leon van Schaik
- Dalibor Vesely
- Ken Yeang
- Alejandro Zaera-Polo
- Elia Zenghelis
