= Sedus =

Sedus Stoll AG
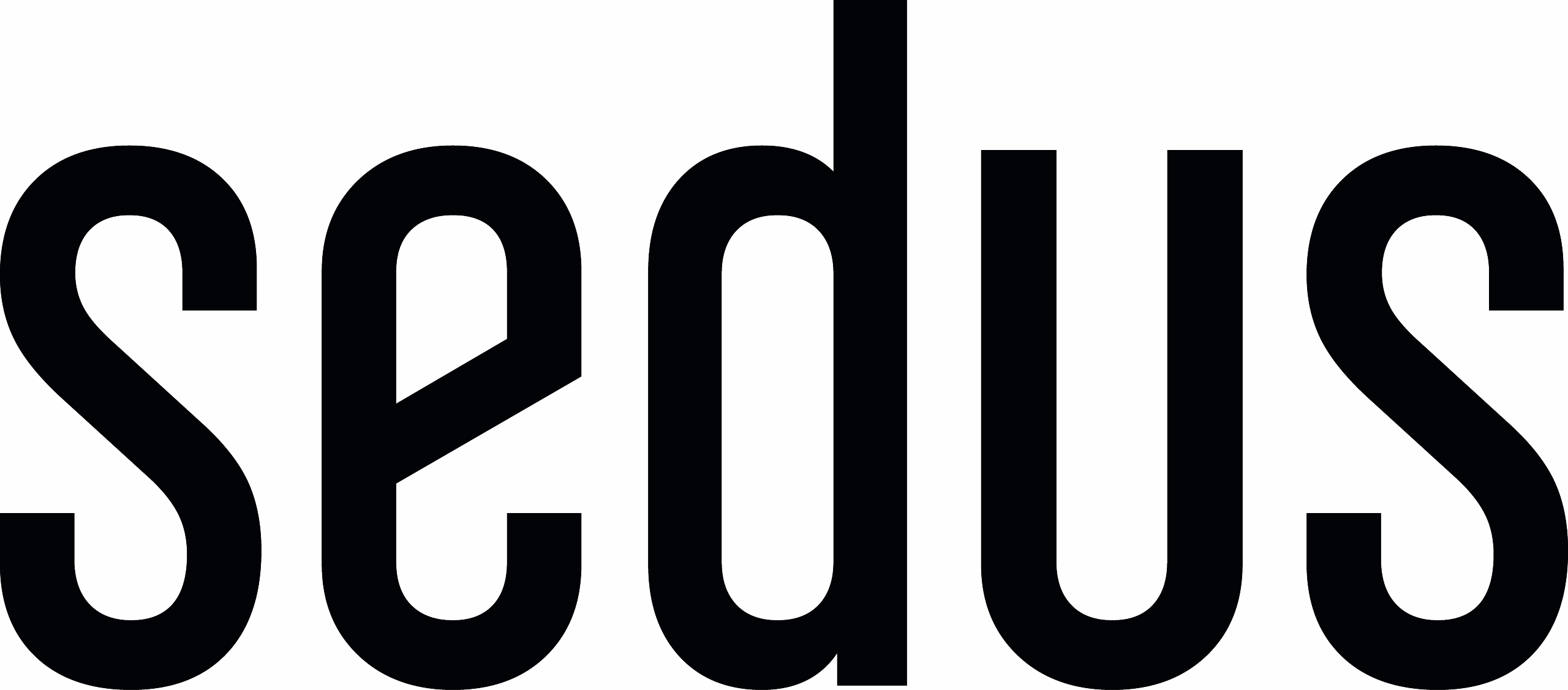
- Type: Public limited company
- Industry: Furniture
- Founded: 1871 (public limited company since 1995)
- Headquarters: Dogern, Germany
- Key people: • Director of Engineering/Development/Marketing/Sales: Daniel Kittner • Director of Finance/Human Resources/IT: Cornel Spohn
- Revenue: 242,5 million Euro (2024)
- Number of employees: 1134 (2024: quarterly average not including apprentices)
- Website: www.sedus.com

Sedus Stoll AG, with head office in Dogern (Waldshut (district)), Baden-Württemberg, is a full-service supplier of office equipment and workplace concepts. The company production is in Dogern and in Geseke. With nine subsidiaries in France (Paris), Italy (Cadorago), Spain (Madrid), Austria (Vienna), the United Kingdom (London), the Netherlands (Zoetermeer), Belgium (Eembodegem-Aalst), Switzerland (Rickenbach SO) and Dubai, Sedus is one of Europe's major office furniture manufacturers. Sales have been facilitated in more than 70 countries through partner companies.

== Company history ==
In 1871, Albert Stoll I set up the “Stoll & Klock” chair factory in Waldshut, together with Max Klock. When Max Klock left in 1879, the company became known as Albert Stoll. After the death of Albert Stoll I, his wife Bertha Stoll continued running the business initially, followed by his son Albert Stoll II.

In 1926, Albert Stoll II designed the internationally patented "Federdreh", the first swivel chair with a swivelling column suspension. When Albert Stoll II died in 1937, three of his sons continued to run the chair factory: Albert Stoll III managed the factory in Koblenz and Christof Stoll and Martin Stoll ran the Waldshut company together. In 1958, Christof and Martin Stoll split up the family enterprise, Albert Stoll OHG, and created two new companies: Christof Stoll KG in Waldshut (with the SEDUS brand name) and the Martin Stoll Federdreh chair factory in Tiengen.

As a consequence of company growth, the production facilities of Christof Stoll KG were gradually moved to the new site in Dogern from 1969 onwards.

In the 1970s, the company developed numerous innovations such as the Anatomic chair, the Permanent Contact backrest and the "Similar" mechanism (principle of dynamic sitting). By 1987, a total of eight sales companies had been established in Europe.

In 1985, Christof Stoll and his wife Emma established the non-profit Stoll VITA Foundation and transferred their assets, which also included the majority shareholding in the family company operating as Sedus Stoll AG from 1995 onwards, to this foundation.

In 1999, Sedus Stoll AG acquired the majority shareholding in office furniture manufacturer Klöber GmbH, in Überlingen. The merger with Gesika Büromöbelwerke GmbH was completed in 2002, as a result of which the Karl Bröcker Foundation in Lippstadt became Sedus' second main shareholder. In 2008, Gesika Büromöbelwerk GmbH changed its name to Sedus Systems GmbH, Geseke.

The Sedus Stoll AG company headquarters was relocated to Dogern in 2018. After around two years of planning and construction, Sedus put the new "Futura 2" production facility at the Geseke site into operation in 2023.

== Architecture ==
The high-bay warehouse at the Dogern site was extended and redesigned by Sauerbruch Hutton in 2002. The building, with its cuboid structure, was given a characteristic façade. The new development and innovation centre in Dogern, which was planned and implemented by Ludloff Ludloff Architekten from Berlin, was completed in 2010. The new "Sedus Smart Office" company centre was also built during the course of the relocation to Dogern in 2018.
