= Sauerbruch Hutton =

- Founded at: London, 1989
- Legal status: GmbH
- Headquarters: Berlin
- Fields: Architecture, Urban Planning, Interior, Product Design
- Staff: 100
- Website: www.sauerbruchhutton.com

Sauerbruch Hutton is an international agency for architecture, urban planning and design. It was founded in London in 1989 and is now based in Berlin, Germany. The practice is led by Matthias Sauerbruch, Louisa Hutton and Juan Lucas Young.

== Architecture ==
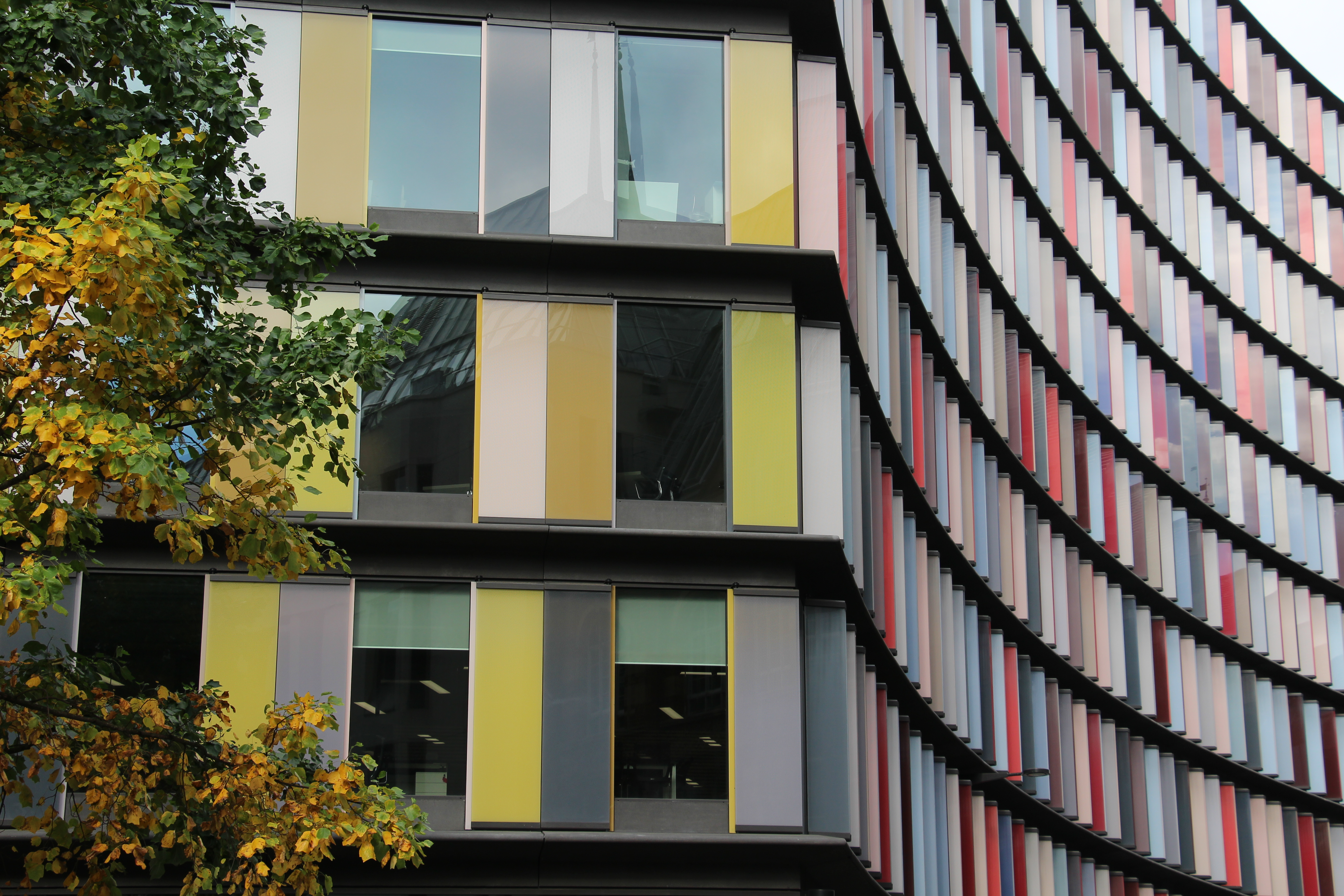
Two New Ludgate, Office Building, London

The office's best-known buildings include the GSW Headquarters in Berlin, the Federal Environment Agency in Dessau and the Brandhorst Museum in Munich. More recently, the Experimenta Science Centre in Heilbronn and the Museum District M9 in Venice Mestre were opened.

Outside of Germany the firm has worked on projects in the UK, Finland, France, Italy, Switzerland and Luxembourg.

== Early work ==
The firm's first offices were located in London, where both founders were engaged in teaching roles. Many of their first commissions were in relatively confined urban areas, such as L House in London. A typical Victorian terrace, this was the practice's first essay in applied colour. The architects used colour to visually expand the cramped spaces.

Early competition entries for Paternoster Square in London (1989), Tokyo International Forum (1989) and the Junction Building in Birmingham (1989) all offered socio-culturally and environmentally sustainable alternatives to the conventions in architecture and planning at the time.

== The GSW Headquarters ==
The GSW Headquarters is situated 250 meters from Checkpoint Charlie. It was the first tall building to rise in Berlin after the fall of the Berlin Wall. The winning competition proposal by Sauerbruch Hutton was a critique of the "Critical reconstruction" established by Hans Stimmann, Berlin's building director from 1991 to 2006.

== Major works ==
In the works that followed, they continued to develop sustainable buildings as well as the use of colour as a building material on projects throughout Europe. The Federal Environmental Agency in Dessau (2005) was a benchmark in the design of sustainable office buildings. A serpentine plan fosters a personal, corporeal perception of the building as one walks along its length – an uncommonly sensuous gesture for an office building.

Printed glass emerged as one of the practice's research interests, with their Pharmacological Research Laboratories (2002) and Jessop West (2008) and Cologne Oval Offices testing new potential for the material. In 2008, with the Brandhorst Museum, Sauerbruch Hutton also began exploring the applications of glazed ceramic as a facade material which is being continued in the development of the M9 Museum in Mestre/Venice.

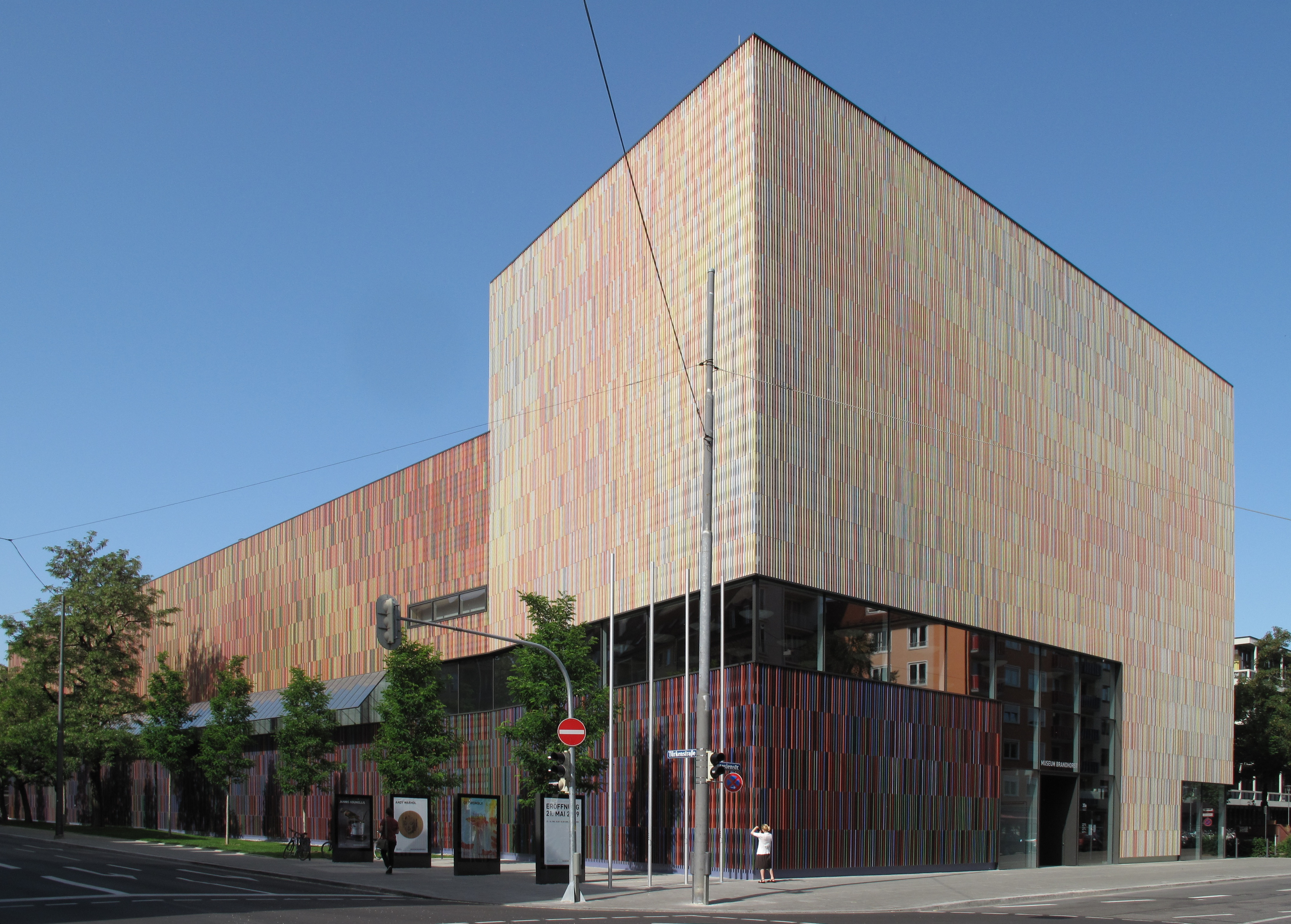
Museum Brandhorst Munich, 2008

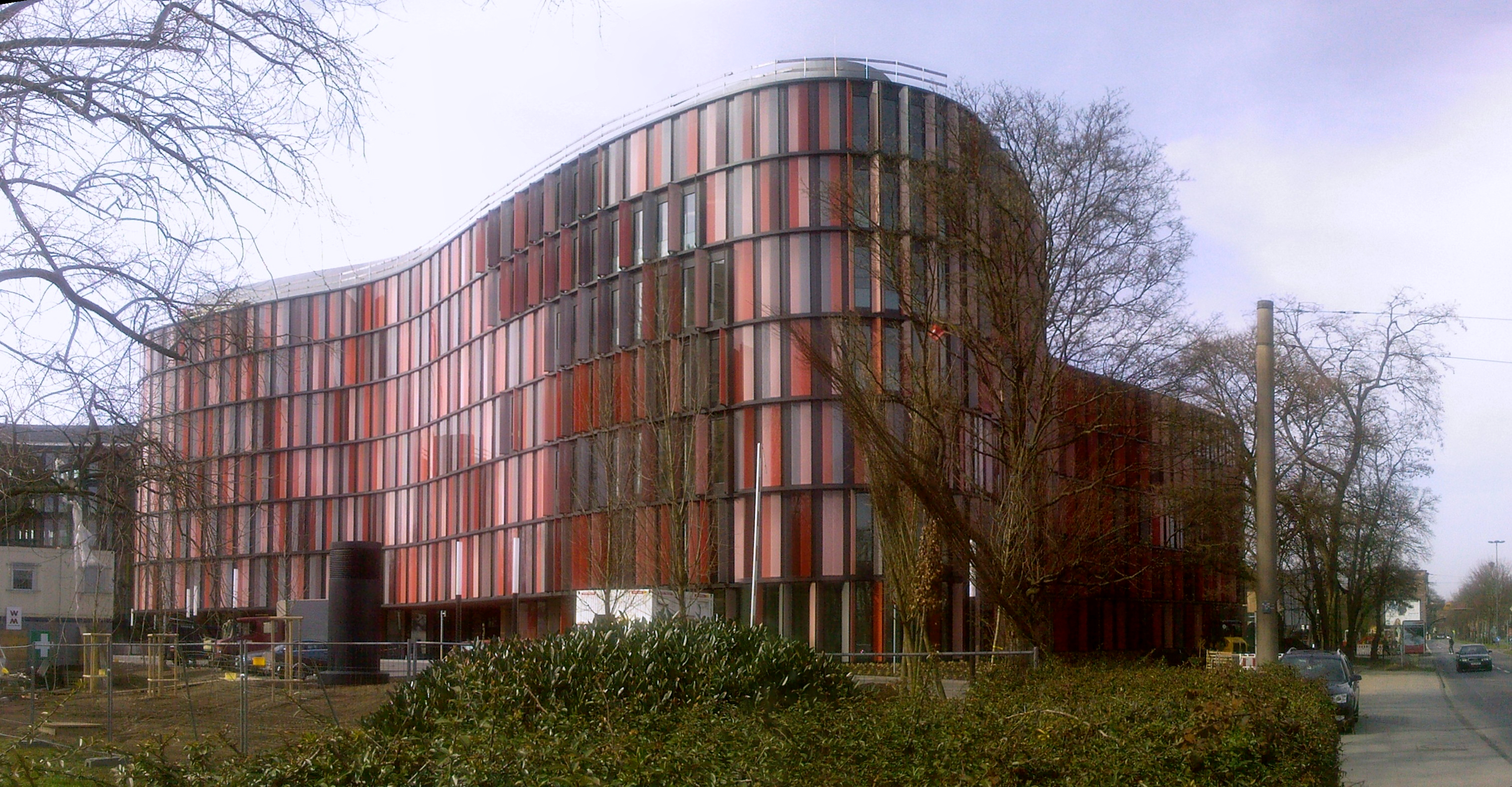
Cologne Oval Offices on Gustav-Heinemann-Ufer, Cologne, 2010

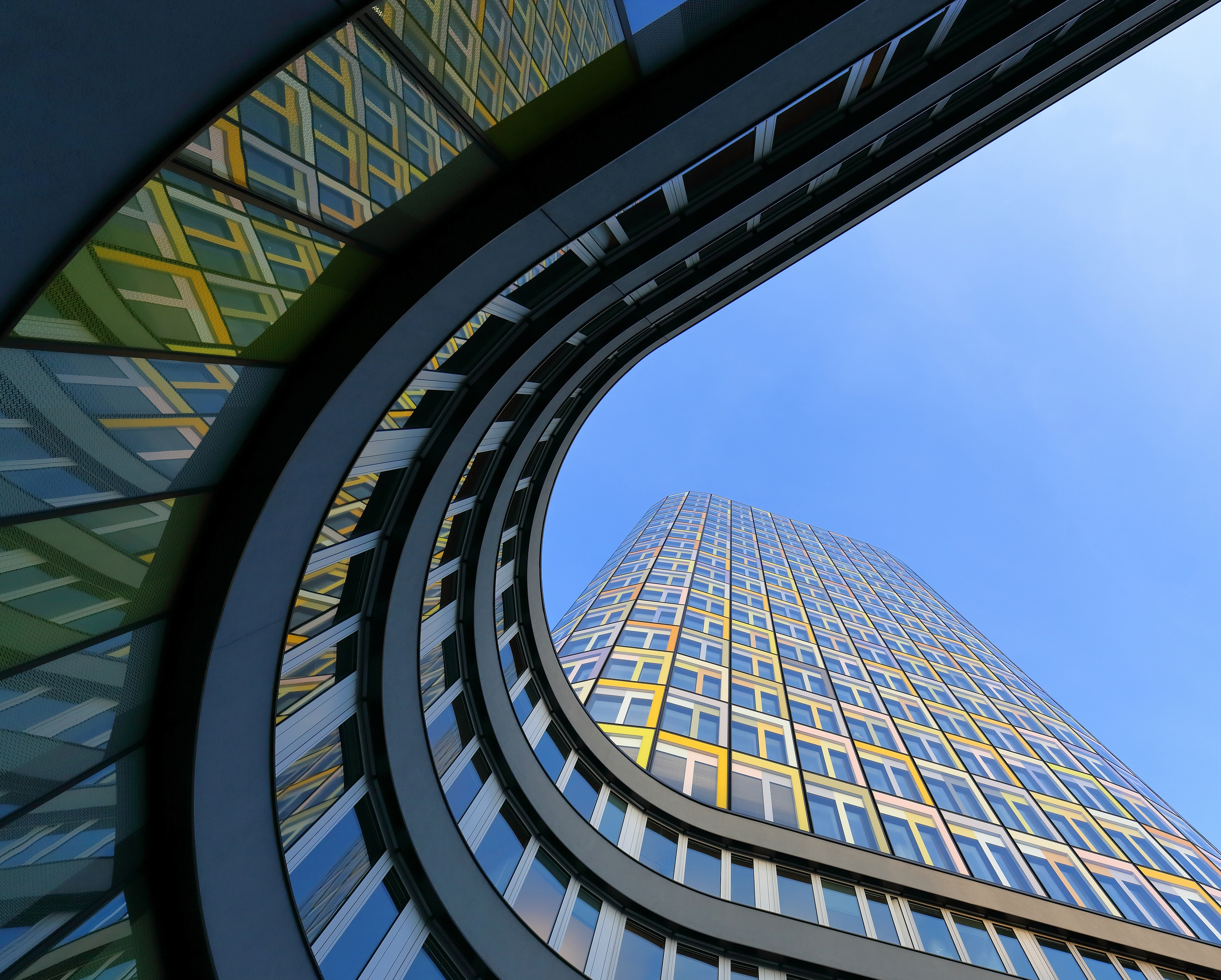
ADAC Headquarters Munich, 2012

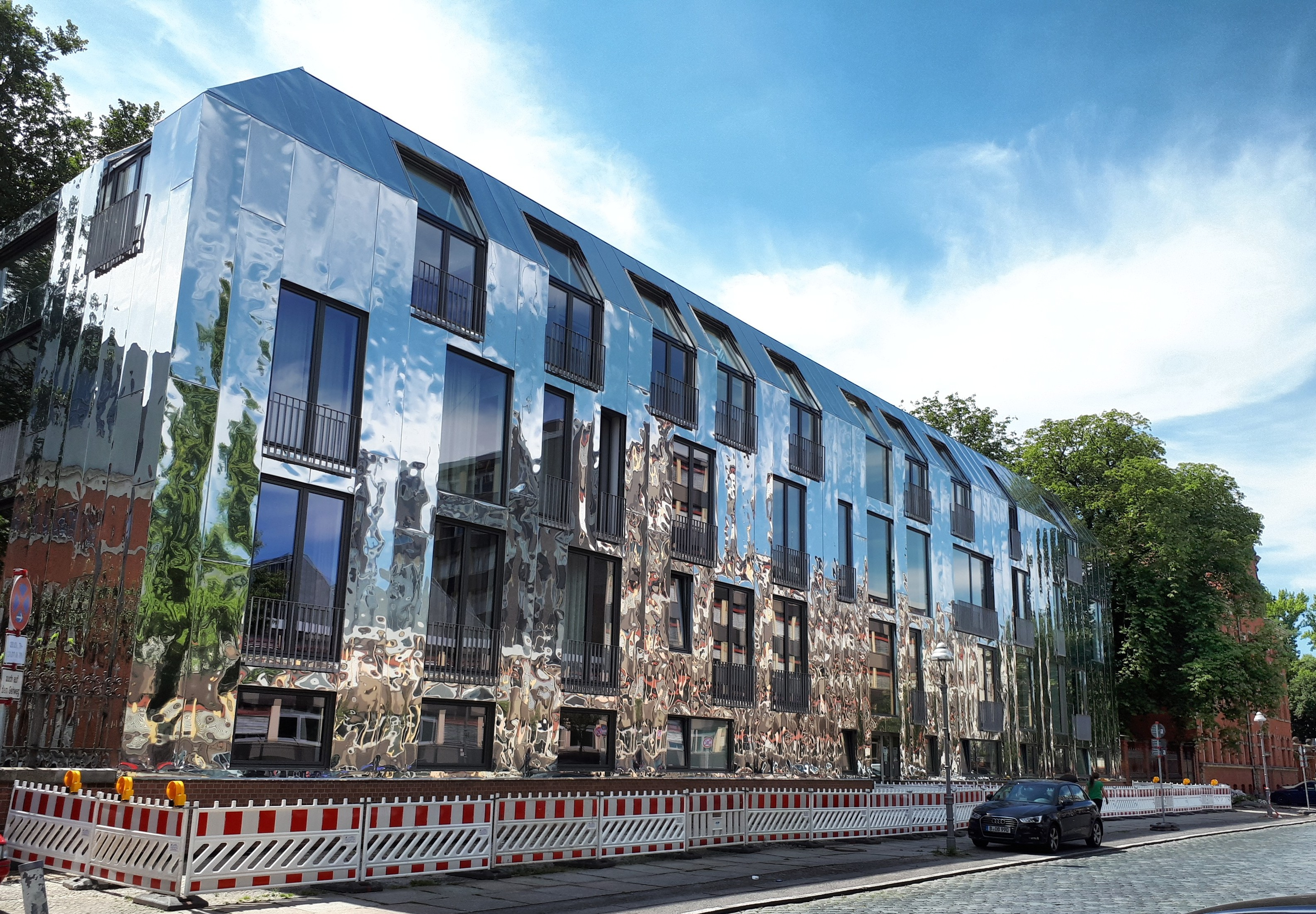
Haus 6, Berlin, 2017

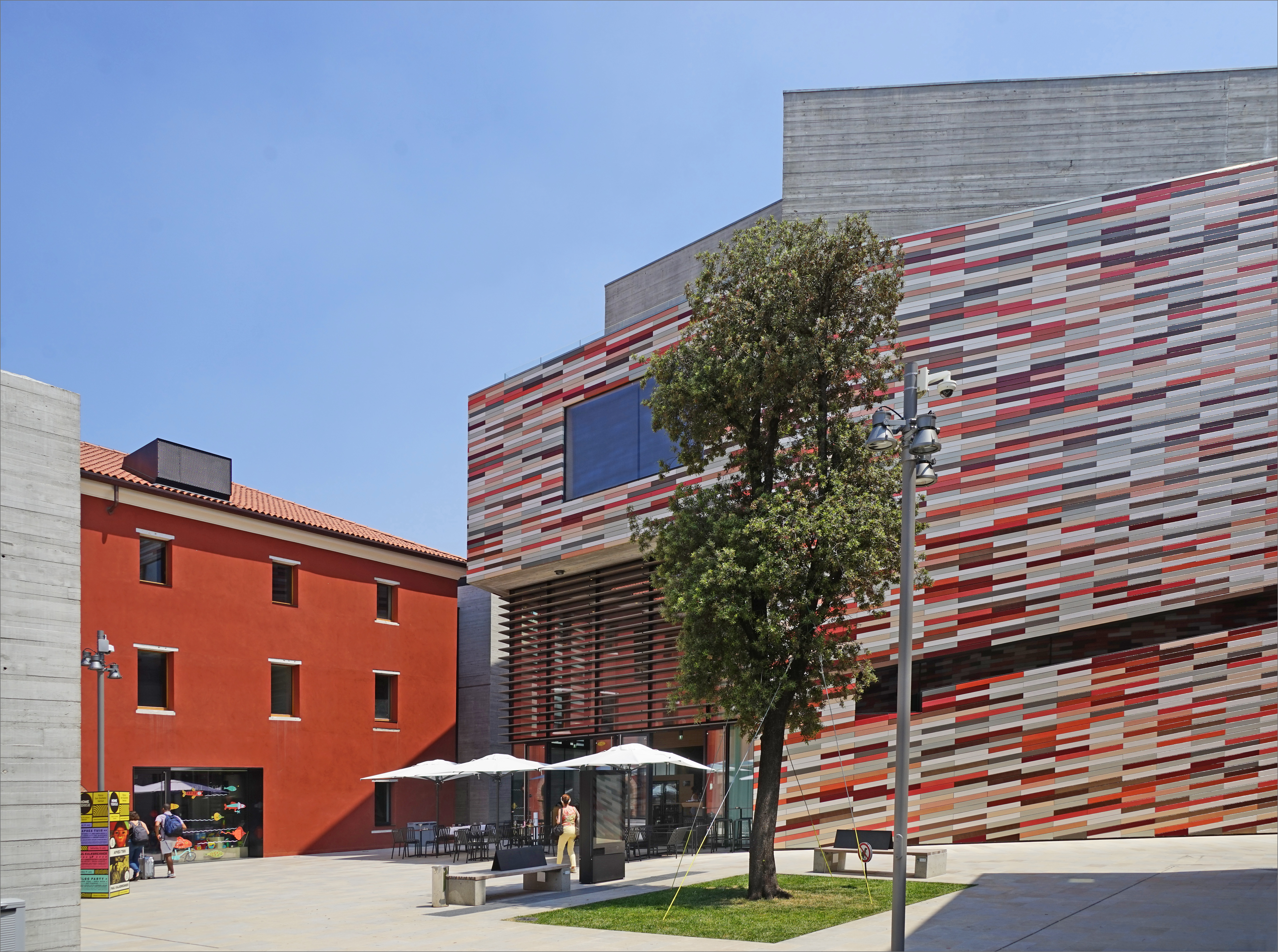
M9 Museum Quarter, Venice Mestre, 2018

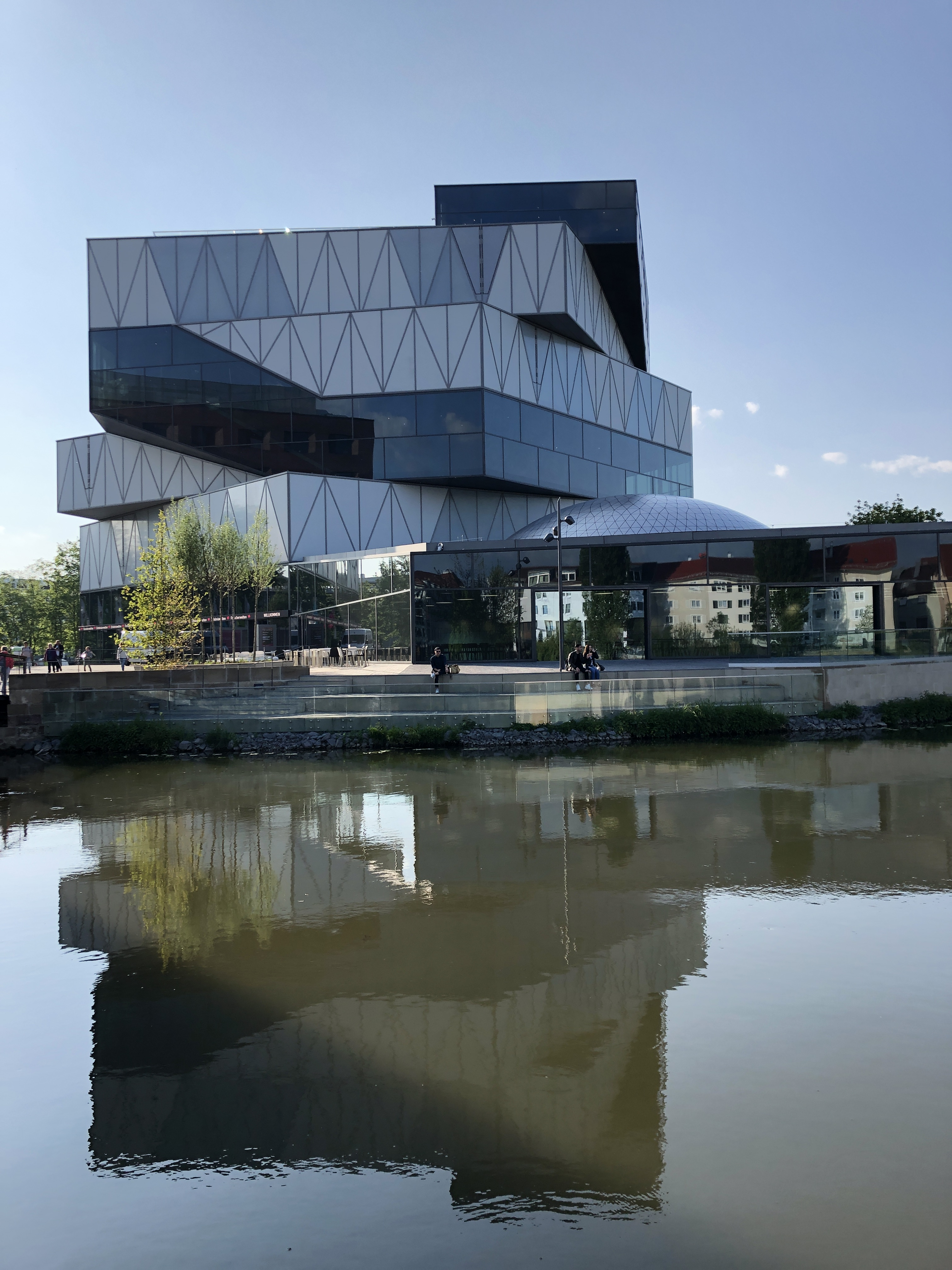
Experimenta, Science Center, Heilbronn, 2019

== Recognition ==
The firm's GSW Headquarters won the Berliner Architekturpreis and Deutscher Architekturpreis, as well as several RIBA and AIA Awards and was nominated for a Stirling Prize in 2000. Several projects have been nominated for or reached the shortlist of the Mies Van Der Rohe Award. The Sitra Headquarters project received a 2011 Holcim Awards for Sustainable Construction Medium rise timber office building in low-to-no carbon emissions and the KfW Westarkade received the 2011 Best Tall Building Worldwide Award. .

In acknowledgement of their built works Sauerbruch Hutton were awarded the Erich Schelling Prize for Architecture in 1998, the Fritz Schumacher Prize for Architecture in 2003, the International Honour Award for Sustainable Architecture in 2010 and the Gottfried Semper Architekturpreis in 2013.

== Biographies ==
Matthias Sauerbruch (b. 1955) studied architecture at Berlin's Hochschule der Künste (now Berlin University of the Arts) and at the Architectural Association in London, graduating in 1984. He has worked at Rem Koolhaas's Office for Metropolitan Architecture in London, leading the House at Checkpoint Charlie project. He has maintained an involvement in teaching throughout his professional career, having held professorships at the University of Virginia, the State Academy of Art and Design in Stuttgart and Technische Universität Berlin. In 2005 he was appointed Kenzo Tange Visiting Design Critic at the Harvard Graduate School of Design. From 2012 to 2015 he was a guest professor at Berlin University of Arts Universität der Künste. He's a commissioner of the Zurich Building Council, a trustee of the Bauhaus Dessau Foundation and an Honorary Fellow of the American Institute of Architects. A member of the Academy of Arts, Berlin, in 2013 he was the curator of "Culture:City" Culture:City, an exhibition shown at the Academy of Arts, Berlin and at Kunsthaus Graz that took a critical eye to the relationship between culture, architecture and urban development. Sauerbruch is a grandson of the surgeon Ferdinand Sauerbruch.

Louisa Hutton (b. 1957) completed her undergraduate degree at Bristol University and later graduated from the Architectural Association. She worked at the offices of Alison and Peter Smithson and has taught at the AA, the University of Virginia and Harvard University. She is a member of the Curatorial Board of the Schelling Architekturstiftung, and was a Commissioner at CABE and a member of the first Steering Committee for the Bundesstiftung Baukultur. In 2014 Louisa Hutton was elected as a Royal Academician of the Royal Academy of Arts.

Juan Lucas Young (b. 1963 in Buenos Aires) studied at the Universidad de Buenos Aires. He has been a partner at Sauerbruch Hutton since 1999.

== Office Structure ==
Since 2023 the responsibilities for the office are shared by 16 partners and 10 associates, with Matthias Sauerbruch, Juan Lucas Young, Vera Hartmann and David Wegener as directors.

About 100 architects, designers, technicians, model makers and administrative specialists work at the Berlin-based office.

== Projects ==
- L-House, London (1991)
- H-House, London (1995)
- Photonic Centre, Berlin (1998)
- Zumtobel Staff Showroom, Berlin (1999)
- N-House, London (1999)
- GSW Headquarters, Berlin (1999)
- British Council, Berlin (2000)
- BMW Event & Delivery Centre, Olympic Park, Munich (2001 competition, 1st Prize)
- Museum of Contemporary Art, Sydney (2001 competition, 1st Prize; project cancelled)
- Experimental Factory, Magdeburg (2001)
- Pharmacological Research Laboratories, Biberach (2002)
- Town Hall, Hennigsdorf (2003)
- High-bay Warehouse for Sedus Stoll AG, Dogern(2003)
- Fire and Police Station for the Government district, Berlin (2004)
- Federal Environmental Agency, Dessau (2005)
- Municipal Savings Bank, Oberhausen (2008)
- Museum Brandhorst, Munich (2008)
- Jessop West, Sheffield (2009)
- Cologne Oval Offices, Cologne (2009)
- Maciachini, Milan (2010)
- Türkentor, Munich (2010)
- KfW Westarkade, Frankfurt (2010)
- ADAC Headquarters, Munich (2012)
- Saint-Georges Centre, Geneva (2011)
- Zac Claude Bernard, Paris (2011)
- University Building, Potsdam (2011)
- Immanuel Church and Parish Centre, Cologne (2013)
- Offices for Munich Re, Munich (2015)
- Kinetik, office building at Boulogne-Billancourt (2014)
- Ministry of Urban Development and the Environment, Hamburg (2013)
- M9 Museum, Venice-Mestre (2018)
- Experimenta, Heilbronn (2019)
- Berlin Metropolitan School, Berlin, 2020
- Luisenblock, Offices for the German Parliament, Berlin, 2021
- Headquarters for Médecins sans Frontières, Geneva, 2022

== Exhibitions ==
- WYSIWYG, traveling exhibition, 1999
- Eyescape Soundscape, Venice Biennale of Architecture, 2004
- 1234 – Die Architektur von Sauerbruch Hutton, Pinakothek der Moderne, Munich, 2006
- How Soon Is Now, Galerie Judin, Berlin, 2014
- Oxymoron, Venice Biennale of Architecture, 2018
- draw love build – l'architettura di sauerbruch hutton, Venice-Mestre, 2021

== Books ==
- Sauerbruch, Matthias; Hutton, Louisa; Gehrke, Andreas; Sauerbruch Hutton Architects (2012). Sauerbruch Hutton : colour in architecture. Berlin. ISBN 978-3-942405-38-6. OCLC 729344921.

== Bibliography ==
- Vera Gloor, Ulrike Kremeier (ed.): Sauerbruch Hutton, Projekte 1990–1996 Projects . Birkhäuser Verlag, Basel 1996, ISBN 3-7643-5348-1
- Matthias Sauerbruch, Louisa Hutton: gsw hauptverwaltung berlin – gsw headquarters berlin, Lars Müller Publishers, Baden 2000, ISBN 3-907078-14-4
- Fernando Márquez Cecilia, Richard Levene (ed.): El Croquis No. 114(I) – Sauerbruch Hutton Architects – Against Type, El Croquis Editorial, Madrid 2003, ISSN 0212-5633
- Matthias Sauerbruch, Louisa Hutton: Sauerbruch Hutton Archive, Lars Müller Publishers, Zurich 2006, ISBN 978-3-03778-083-1
- Monica Gili (ed.): 2G N.52 Sauerbruch Hutton, Editorial Gustavo Gili, Barcelona 2009, ISSN 1136-9647
- Nicolette Baumeister: Baukulturführer 48 – Museum Brandhorst, München. Koch, Schmidt u. Wilhelm 2010, ISBN 978-3-936721-99-7
- Matthias Sauerbruch, Louisa Hutton: Sauerbruch Hutton – Colour in Architecture, Distanz Verlag, Berlin 2012, ISBN 3-942405-38-5
- Matthias Sauerbruch, Louisa Hutton: Sauerbruch Hutton Archive 2, Lars Müller Publishers, Zurich 2016, ISBN 978-3-03778-389-4
- Nicolette Baumeister: Baukulturführer 107 – Immanuelkirche, Köln. Koch, Schmidt u. Wilhelm 2016, ISBN 978-3-943242-67-6
- Hachette Fascicoli (ed.): I Maestri dell'Architettura – Sauerbruch Hutton, Hachette Fascicoli s.r.l, Milan 2018, ISSN 2610-8542
- Dr. Sandra Hofmeister (ed.): Edition DETAIL – Sauerbruch Hutton, DETAIL, Munich 2019, ISBN 978-3-95553-468-4
- Matthias Sauerbruch, Louisa Hutton (ed.): The Turn of the Century – A Reader about Architecture in Europe 1990–2020, Lars Müller Publishers, Zurich 2021, ISBN 978-3-03778-674-1
