= Sally Mackereth =

British architect

Sally Mackereth (born 10 February 1966) is a British architect practising in London. After graduating from the Architectural Association in 1995, Mackereth co-founded Wells Mackereth before creating Studio Mackereth in 2013, which the Telegraph has called one of the best practices in London.

In 2025, Mackereth completed a practice-based PhD, Animating the Inanimate: Architectural ‘Magicking’ at Work.

Mackereth taught as a senior lecturer at the Royal College of Art from 1997 to 2001. In 2020, Mackereth was invited to head the judging panel for the architecture categories of the Dezeen awards alongside Norman Foster. World Architecture News nominated Mackereth as a finalist for the Female Frontier award in 2021.

Mackereth's work includes a conversion of a Victorian stables in King's Cross, London, a renovation of Winterton Lighthouse, and a new-build gallery in the heart of Mayfair. She has also contributed to media channels including the BBC Radio 4's Woman's Hour and Channel 4 discussing architecture and her practice. She has also been involved in designing a range of jewellery as well as retail spaces for brands including Fine and Rare, Royal Salute, Neolithic Bar for Salone del Mobile, and Pringle of Scotland.

== Early life ==
Mackereth was born in Leeds and grew up in the Yorkshire Dales.
