= GSW Immobilien =

Company

GSW Immobilien AG
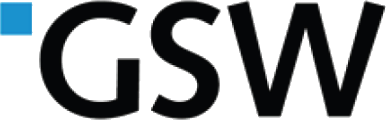
- Company type: Aktiengesellschaft
- Traded as: FWB: GIB
- Industry: Real estate
- Founded: 1924
- Headquarters: Berlin, Germany
- Key people: Thomas Zinnöcker (CEO and chairman of the management board), Eckart von Freyend (Chairman of the supervisory board)
- Products: Investments in residential property, management of commercial property
- Operating income: €101.5 million (2010)
- Net income: €49.3 million (2010)
- Total assets: €2.682 billion (end 2010)
- Total equity: €976.4 million (end 2010)
- Number of employees: 570 (FTE, end 2010)
- Website: www.gsw.de

GSW Immobilien AG, formerly Gemeinnützige Siedlungs- und Wohnungsbaugesellschaft Berlin mbH, is a German real-estate company in Berlin. The company invests in residential property and also manages residential and commercial property on behalf of third parties.

== History ==
Originally a company founded and owned by the city of Berlin, GSW was sold to a private equity consortium led by Cerberus Capital Management and Goldman Sachs' Whitehall fund in 2005. The company raised €468 million in an initial public offering on the Frankfurt Stock Exchange in April 2011, the year after an IPO attempt failed due to market volatility. Goldman and Cerberus retained an approximate 10% stake each in the company until 2012.

GSW Immobilien was acquired by Deutsche Wohnen in 2013, which holds around 98.8 percent of the shares.

GSW's Berlin headquarters was designed by Sauerbruch Hutton, for which they received a Stirling Prize nomination in 2000.

== Criticism ==
The GSW is criticized by both the Senate of Berlin as well as several tenants initiatives for allegedly overcharging their tenants for operating costs while simultaneously not properly maintaining apartments in an attempt to maximize profits. Since 2011 several tenants initiatives have been protesting against the housing policy of the GSW.
