= Stealing from the Saracens =

2020 non-fiction book by Diana Darke

- Author: Diana Darke
- Publisher: Hurst & Co
- Publication date: 2020

Stealing from the Saracens: How Islamic Architecture Shaped Europe is a non-fiction book by British writer Diana Darke, published by Hurst & Co in 2020. In the book, Darke writes about the influence of Islamic architecture on European architecture of the Middle Ages.

Several leading academics in architecture history, including Aaron Betsky, Vaughan Hart and William Whyte reviewed the book. Some of its proposals, such as Big Ben being influenced by a minaret in Syria, or a pre-Islamic Syrian church being an Islamic influence on Notre-Dame de Paris, were criticised by reviewers, some of whom perceived a simplified narrative that reduced the scale of Persian and Byzantine influence on both Islamic and Western architecture.

== Content ==
Darke, who graduated in German and Arabic from Oxford University, did not pursue a career in academia but rather worked as a journalist in Damascus, Syria until the start of the civil war. In April 2019, after the Notre-Dame de Paris fire, she was inspired to write the book after pointing out her belief that Notre-Dame and all other Gothic architecture is based on a church in Qalb Loze, Syria, built by the Christian Byzantine Empire in the 5th century.

The book tracks the Gothic features of the pointed arch to the Dome of the Rock in 7th-century Jerusalem and the ribbed vault to the Great Mosque of Córdoba in 10th-century Al-Andalus. The windows of the Saint Denis basilica are described as being traceable from the Muslim world via adoption in the wealthy Italian port of Amalfi, then Monte Cassino Abbey and Cluny Abbey. In Venice, another Italian port that traded with the East, the influence went beyond architecture, with local women wearing garments similar to a niqab. Sir Christopher Wren, best known for St Paul's Cathedral in London, is cited for his statement that Gothic architecture should be called Saracen architecture.

The book's title is a play on the theory that the medieval European exonym for Muslims, Saracen, came from the Arabic saraqa meaning "to steal".

== Reception ==
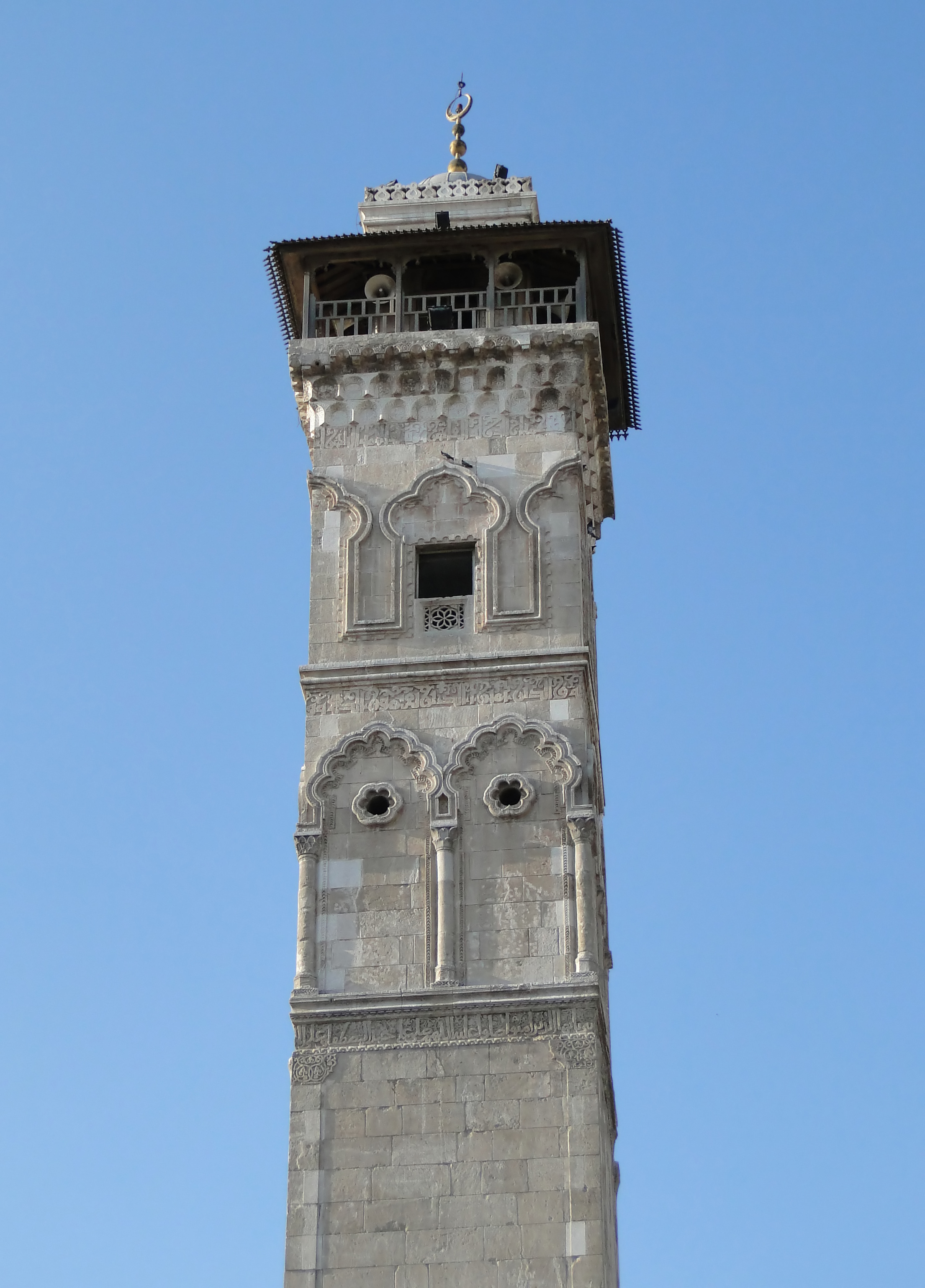
Minaret of the Great Mosque of Aleppo

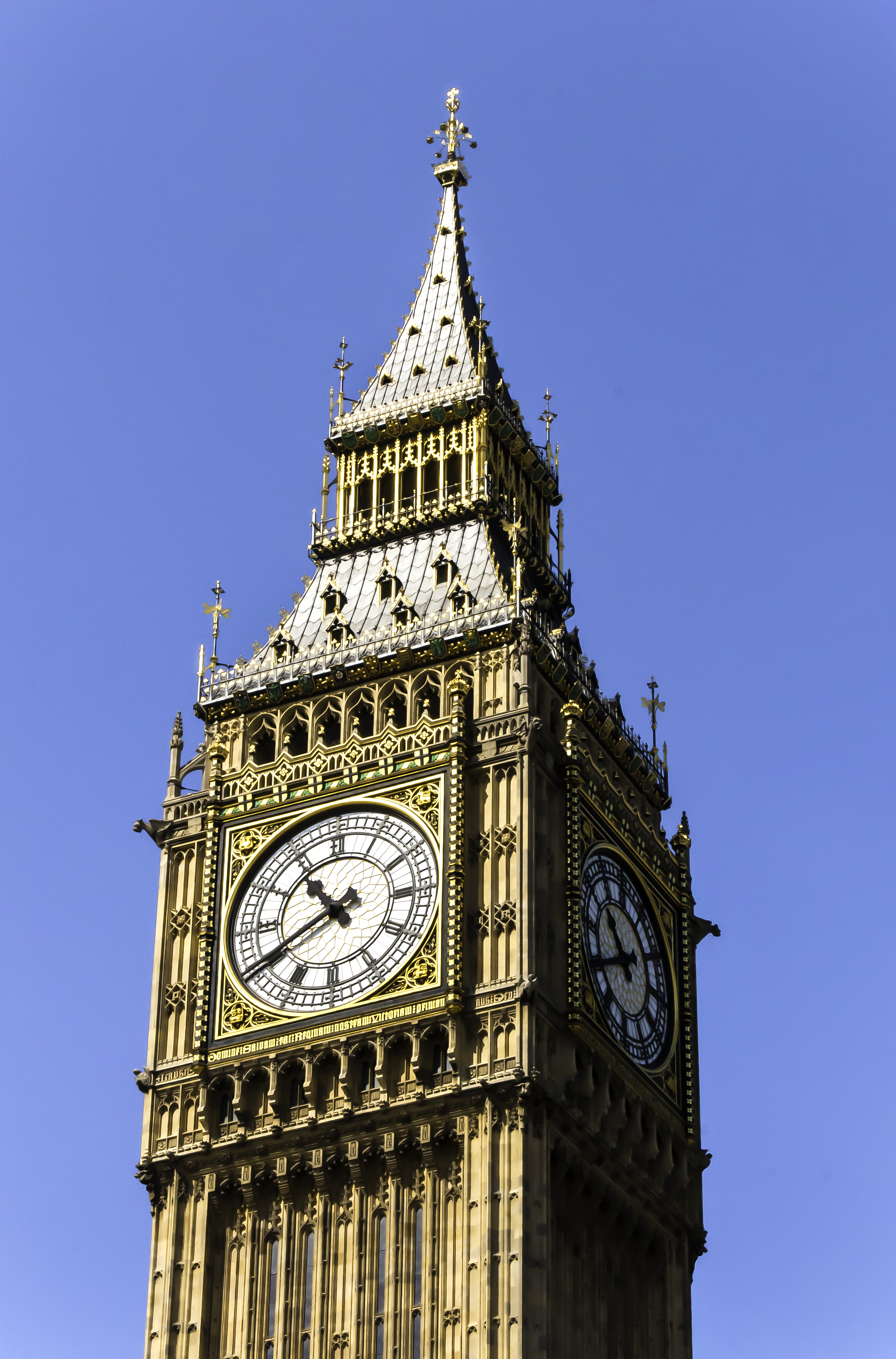
Big Ben. Rowan Moore and Vaughan Hart were not convinced by Darke's argument that the two towers are related.

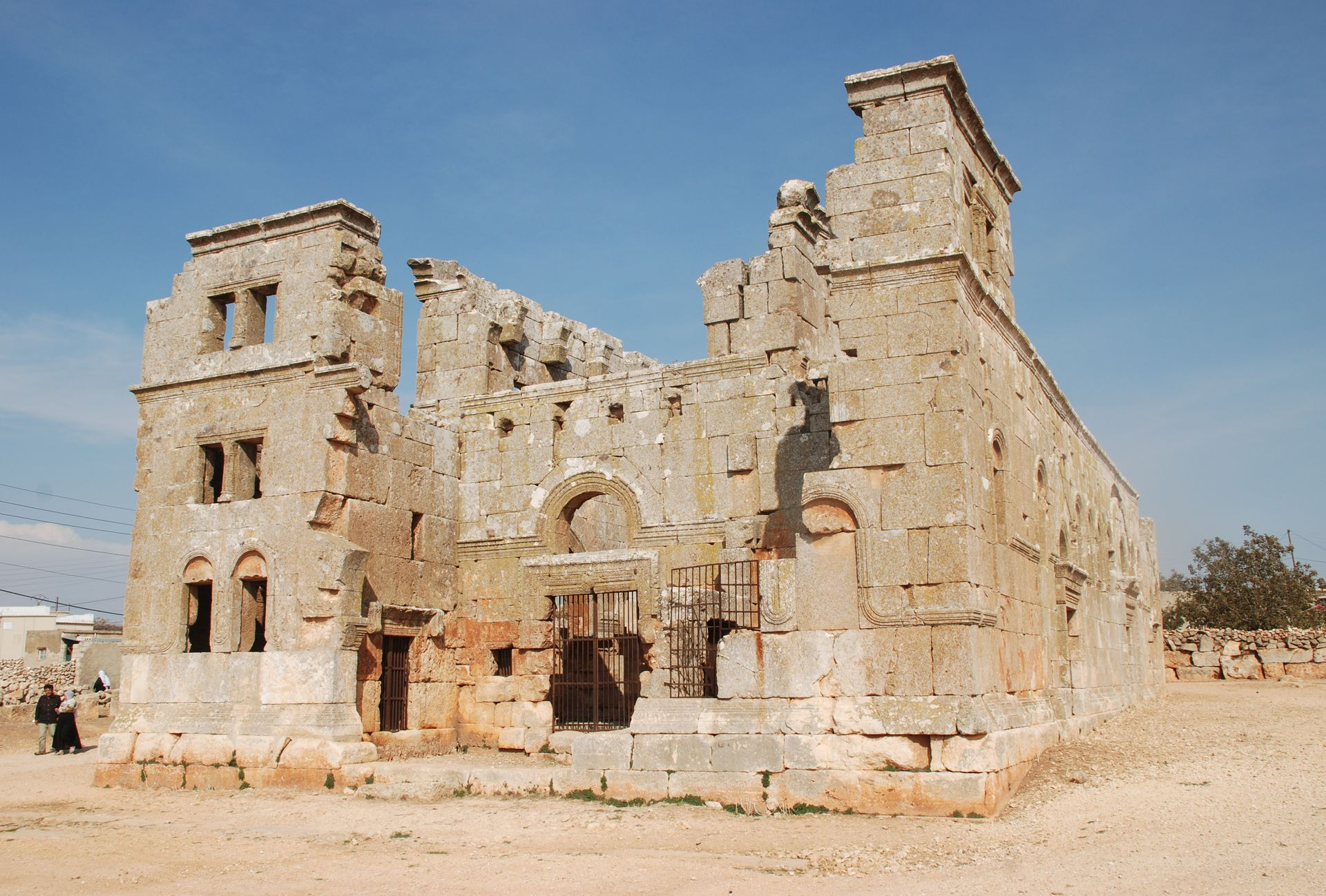
Darke argues that this 5th-century Byzantine church in Qalb Loze, Syria is the inspiration for Notre-Dame de Paris. Several reviewers questioned how a church predating Islam was evidence of Islamic influence on the French church.

Prior to its release, the book was the subject of an article in The Guardian by architecture correspondent Oliver Wainwright, titled "Looted landmarks: how Notre-Dame, Big Ben and St Mark's were stolen from the east". Subsequent reviews mentioned this article and how its title built interest in the book through controversy, but also called it oversimplified and unrepresentative of the book's contents. A review in Germany's Der Tagesspiegel noted that the book coincided with the international controversy over Istanbul's Hagia Sophia, a former church and museum that had been reconverted into a mosque. Contrary to Wainwright's headline, Darke instead argues that culture is interconnected and architecture does not belong to a single culture. In the book, she mentions how the Muslims themselves adapted some elements from the Greek and Roman remains in the Middle East. Sameer Rahim of Apollo magazine believed that Darke underplayed the Early Muslim conquests and that the book reminded him of his relatives who believed everything originated from Islam.

Darke's citation of Wren has been described as out of context by some reviewers. Vaughan Hart, a professor of architecture at the University of Bath and author of a book on Wren's Eastern influences, wrote that "Wren had self-interested reasons for making this claim, and knew very little about Arab buildings". In the Asian Review of Books, Peter Gordon wrote that Wren's statement on Gothic architecture was actually one of contempt, though the double dome he used on St Paul's is of Middle Eastern origin. Aaron Betsky, director of the School of Architecture + Design at the Virginia Tech College of Architecture and Urban Studies, criticised the hypothesis that Filippo Brunelleschi based the design of the Duomo of Florence from Arab texts.

Hart wrote that Darke's comparison between Big Ben and a now destroyed minaret of the Great Mosque of Aleppo has no evidence of direct influence and could distract from her argument. Architecture critic Rowan Moore of The Observer named this as an example of some unconvincing arguments in the book. Gordon argued that starting the book with the church of Qalb Loze is inaccurate as the building is Christian and predates Islam, while mosaics, coloured glass and bell towers were in Europe before that religion began. William Whyte, Professor of Social and Architectural History at the University of Oxford, concurred that western Gothic has foreign influence but disagreed that this was mostly Islamic: "the Islamic world and Western Christendom shared a common debt to Byzantine, Roman, and ancient Greek architecture — and this, in turn, owed something to the art of Egypt, India, and elsewhere. This is not theft, but a shared inheritance".
