= Benjamin Cole (instrument maker) =

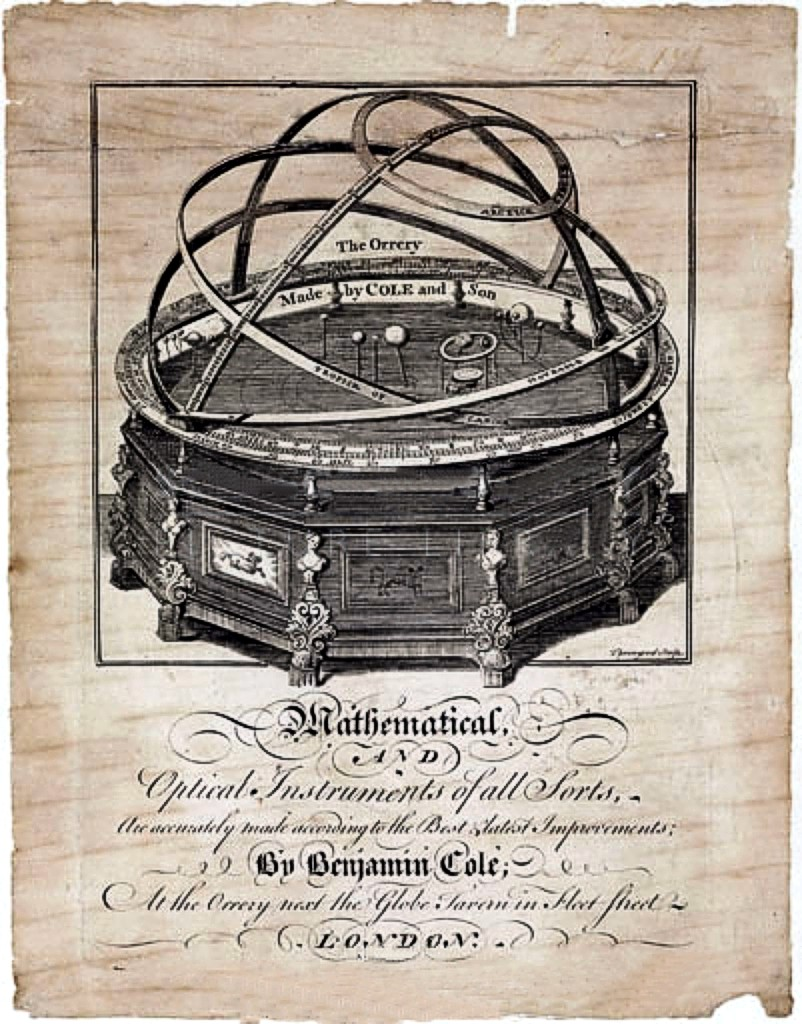
Mathematical AND Optical Instruments of all Sorts Accurately made according to the Best & Latest Improvements By Benjamin Cole at the Orrery next the Globe Tavern in Fleet Street LONDON

Benjamin Cole (1695–1766) was an English surveyor, cartographer, instrument maker, engraver and bookbinder living in Oxford. His sons William and Benjamin were also instrument makers in London, while another son, Maximilian, was an engraver in Oxford.

== Works ==
Benjamin Cole had a long-standing interest in freemasonry and engraved the frontispiece to the 1756 Book of Constitutions after succeeding John Pine in 1743 as official engraver to the Grand Lodge.

Cole drew up the ward maps for the first edition of the historian and topographer William Maitland's (c.1693–1757) posthumous History of London from Its Foundation to the Present Time (1769). (Cf. John Entick's New and Accurate History and Survey of London of 1766.) His music engravings included a collection by John Frederick Lampe with a setting of the Entered Apprentice's Song. Cole contributed to some of the engravings in A General History of the Pyrates in 1724. In 1728/9, he published a copy of the Old Charges with speeches by two Freemasons, Francis Drake and architect Edward Oakley. His illustrations appeared in books ranging from fables for children to manuals of military drill, a notable work being a venture in collaboration with Edward Oakley, The Magazine of Architecture, Perspective, and Sculpture which provided an introduction to Palladian architecture.

Cole made a wide range of instruments that are to be seen in museums throughout Britain. He was apprenticed to Thomas Wright and was free in the Merchant Taylors' Company. The firm of Wright & Cole operated until 1748 when Cole succeeded Wright. Cole & Son conducted their business between 1751 and 1766 from the Orrery adjoining the Globe Tavern, in Fleet Street, London. This address became 136 Fleet Street about 1760 and 200 Fleet Street in later years. The business was taken over by John Troughton in 1782, surviving as Cooke, Troughton & Sims in the twentieth century.

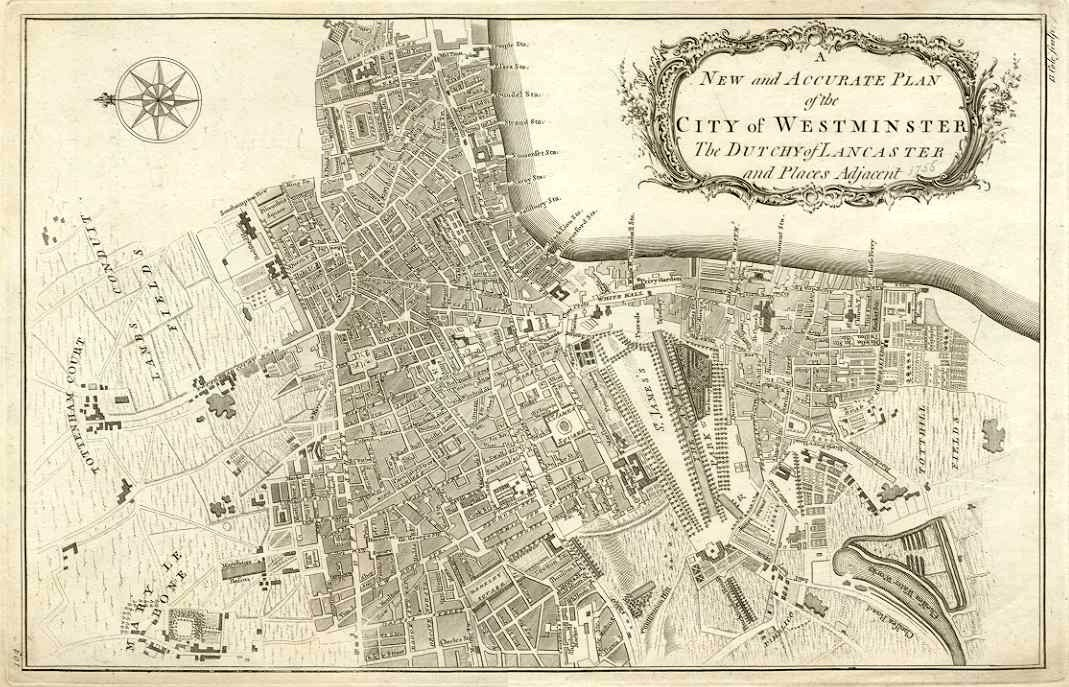
Map of City of Westminster 1755 by Benjamin Cole

== Family ==
Cole started a dynasty of engravers to the Freemasons. His son Benjamin (1725-1813), was apprenticed to his father in 1739. Another son, William, worked as engraver to the Bank of England, and took over control and production of the freemasons' engraved lists in 1767. William's son, John, founded a ‘Masonic Printing Office’ in London.

== Bibliography ==
- Loftus, Ernest Achey - A history of the descendants of Maximilian Cole of Oxford, who flourished in the 17th century, London / Adlard & Son, Limited (1938)
