= Inigo Jones =

English architect (1573–1652)

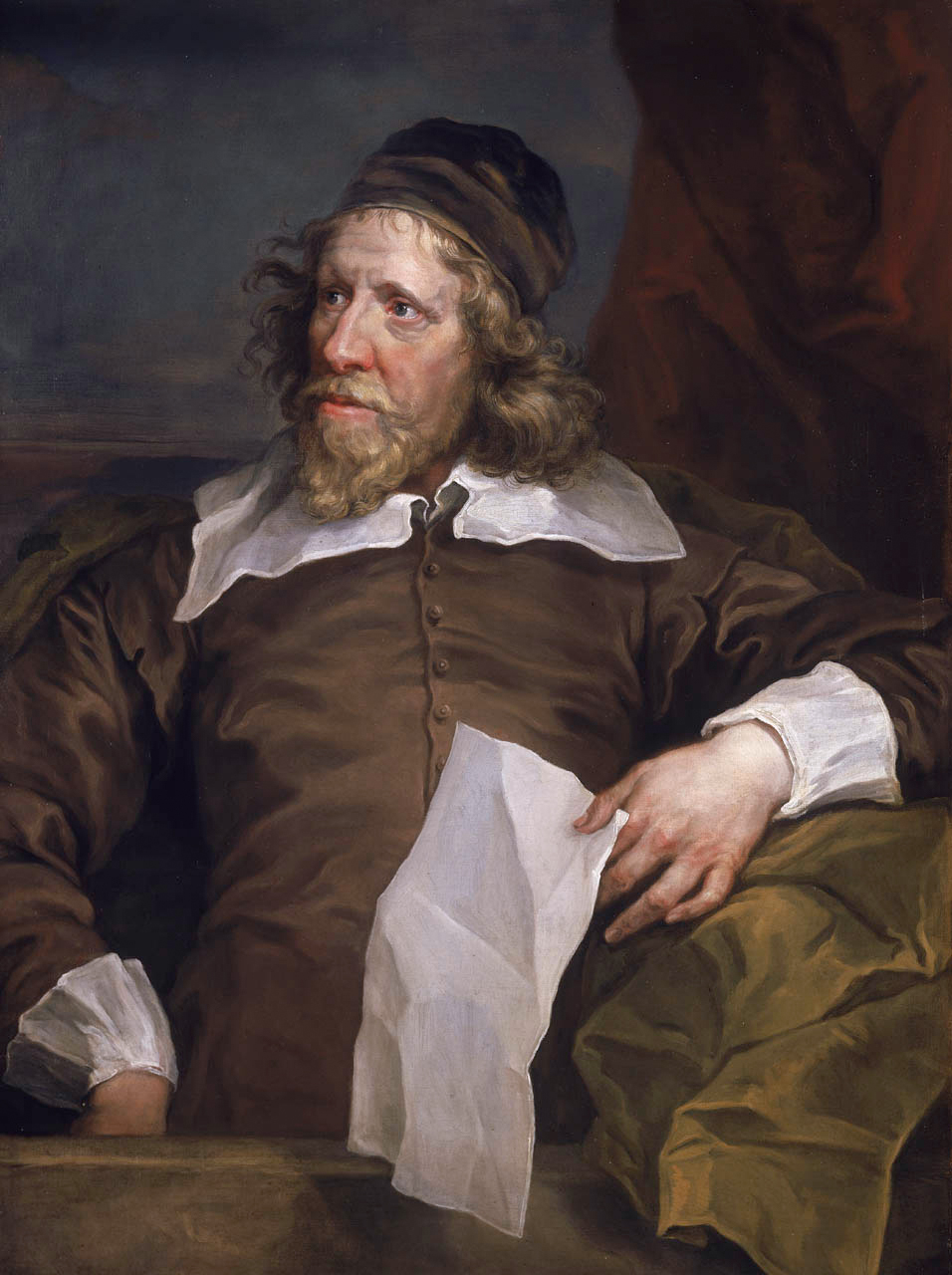
- Portrait by William Hogarth, c. 1757–1758
- Born: 15 July 1573; London, England
- Died: 21 June 1652 (aged 78); Somerset House, London
- Occupation: Architect
- Buildings: Banqueting House, Whitehall; Queen's House; Wilton House; Covent Garden

Inigo Jones (15 July 1573 – 21 June 1652) was an English architect who was the first significant architect in England in the early modern era and the first to employ Vitruvian rules of proportion and symmetry in his buildings. As the most notable architect in England, Jones was the first person to introduce the classical architecture of Rome and the Italian Renaissance to England. He left his mark on London by his design of single buildings, such as the Queen's House which is the first building in England designed in a pure classical style, and the Banqueting House, Whitehall, as well as the layout for Covent Garden square which became a model for future developments in the West End. He made major contributions to stage design by his work as a theatrical designer for several dozen masques, most by royal command and many in collaboration with Ben Jonson.

== Early life and career ==
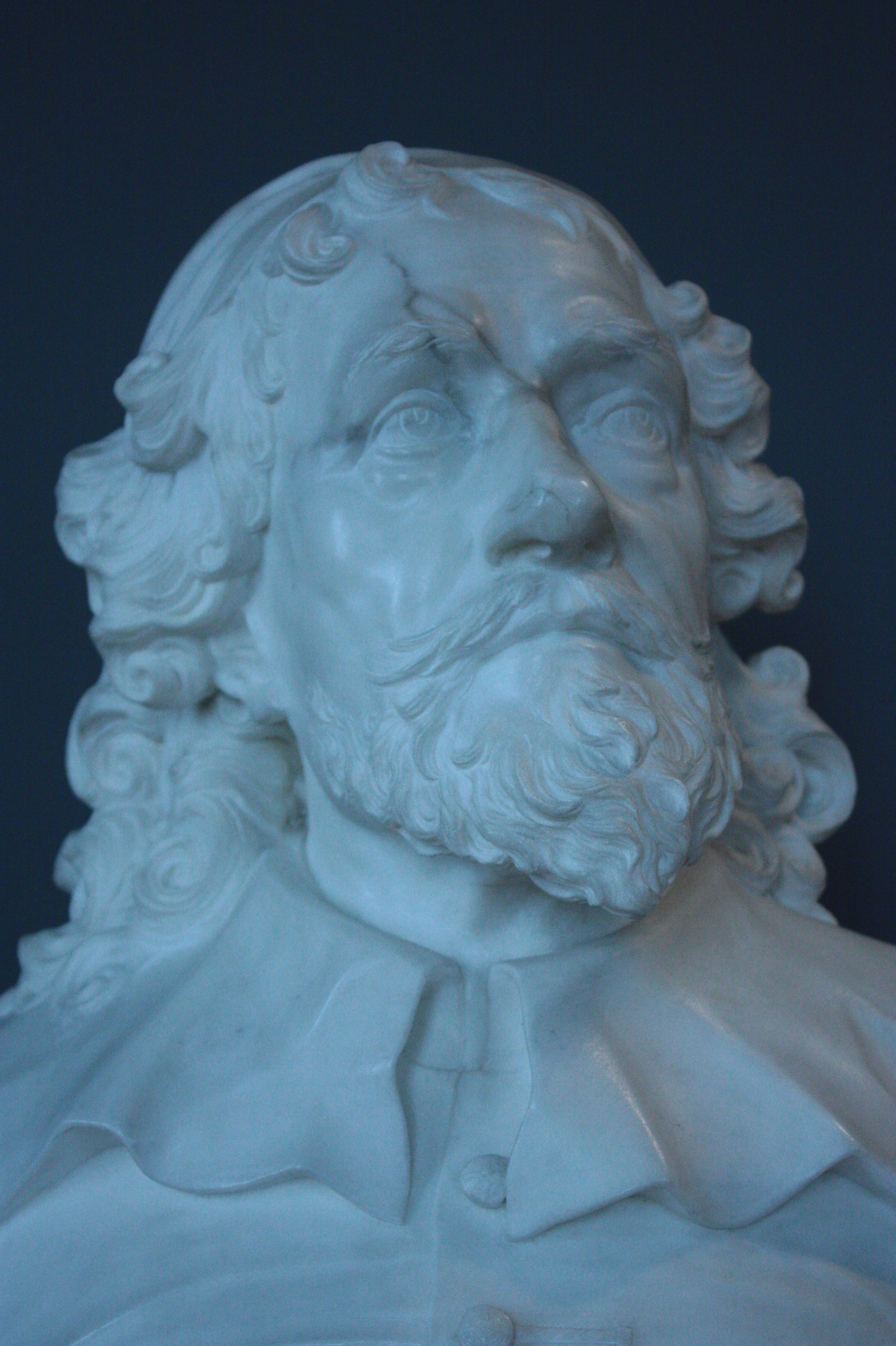
Bust of Inigo Jones by John Michael Rysbrack, 1725

Jones was born in Smithfield, London, as the son of clothworker Inigo Jones Snr., and baptised at the church of St Bartholomew-the-Less, but little is known about his early years. Later Welsh sources claim that the family was from Wales, and even that Inigo was originally named Ynir or Ynyr Jones, but no records from his own time indicate any family ties to Wales.

He did not approach the architectural profession in the traditional way, namely either by rising up from a craft or through early exposure to the Office of Works, although there is evidence that Christopher Wren obtained information that recorded Jones as an apprentice joiner in St Paul's Churchyard. At some point before 1603, a rich patron (possibly the Earl of Pembroke or the Earl of Rutland) sent him to Italy to study drawing after being impressed by the quality of his sketches. From Italy he travelled to Denmark where he worked for Christian IV on the design of the palaces of Rosenborg and Frederiksborg.

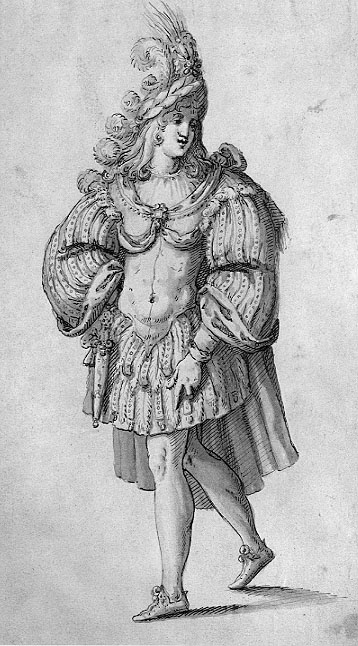
A masque costume for a knight, designed by Inigo Jones

Jones first became famous as a designer of costumes and stage settings, especially after he brought "masques" to the stage. Under the patronage of Queen Anne of Denmark (the consort of King James I), he is credited with introducing movable scenery and the proscenium arch to English theatre. Between 1605 and 1640, he was responsible for staging over 500 performances, collaborating with Ben Jonson for many years, despite a relationship fraught with competition and jealousy: the two had arguments about whether stage design or literature was more important in theatre. (Jonson ridiculed Jones in a series of his works, written over two decades.) Over 450 drawings for the scenery and costumes survive, demonstrating Jones's virtuosity as a draughtsman and his development between 1605 and 1609 from initially showing "no knowledge of Renaissance draughtsmanship" to exhibiting an "accomplished Italianate manner" and understanding of Italian set design, particularly that of Alfonso and Giulio Parigi. This development suggests a second visit to Italy, c. 1606, influenced by the ambassador Henry Wotton. Jones learned to speak Italian fluently and there is evidence that he owned an Italian copy of Andrea Palladio's I quattro libri dell'architettura with marginalia that refer to Wotton. His architectural work was particularly influenced by Palladio. To a lesser extent, he also held to the architectural principles of the ancient Roman writer Vitruvius.

Jones's first recorded architectural design is for a monument to Frances, Lady Cotton, commissioned by Rowland Cotton, c. 1608–1611, at Norton-in-Hales, Shropshire, showing early signs of his classical intentions. In July 1606, Jones made scenery for a masque at Theobalds for the Earl of Salisbury. In the following years, Jones made drawings for the Earl of Salisbury's New Exchange in the Strand, where work commenced in June 1608, and the central tower of St Paul's Cathedral, displaying a similar practical architectural inexperience and immature handling of themes from sources including Palladio, Serlio and Sangallo. In 1609, having perhaps accompanied Salisbury's son and heir, Viscount Cranborne, around France, he appears as an architectural consultant at Hatfield House, making small modifications to the design as the project progressed, and in 1610, Jones was appointed Surveyor to Prince Henry. He devised the masques the Barriers and the Masque of Oberon for the Prince and was possibly involved in some alterations to St James's Palace.

On 27 April 1613, Jones was appointed the position of Surveyor of the King's Works and shortly after, embarked on a tour of Italy with the Earl of Arundel, destined to become one of the most important patrons in the history of English art. On this trip, Jones was exposed to the architecture of Rome, Padua, Florence, Vicenza, Genoa and Venice among others. His surviving sketchbook shows his preoccupation with such artists as Parmigianino and Andrea Schiavone. He is also known to have met Vincenzo Scamozzi at this time. His annotated copy of Palladio's Quattro libri dell'architettura also demonstrates his close interest in classical architecture: Jones gave priority to Roman antiquity rather than observing the contemporary fashion in Italy. He was probably the first native-born to study these Roman remains first hand and this was key to the new architecture Jones introduced in England and Wales.

== Masques ==
Jones worked as a producer and architect for masques from 1605 to 1640, but his most known work in this field came from his collaboration with poet and playwright Ben Jonson. Having worked together for fifteen years, the two debated and had disagreements about their line of work and about what was most integral in a masque. While Jonson argued that the most important aspect of a masque was the written word that the audience heard, Jones argued that the visual spectacle was the most important aspect, and that what the audience saw was more important. Jones also felt that the architect had just as much creative freedom and rights as the writer or poet of the masque. In defence of this Jones stated that masques were "nothing but pictures with light and motion," making little to note of the words spoken.

Jones's work on masques with Jonson is credited to be one of the first instances of scenery introduced in theatre. In his masques, curtains were used and placed in between the stage and the audience, and they were to be opened to introduce a scene. Jones was also known for using the stage and theatre space in its entirety, putting his actors throughout different parts of the theatre, such as placing them below the stage or elevating them onto a higher platform. Jones's settings on the stage also incorporated different uses of light, experimenting with coloured glasses, screens and oiled paper to create a softer source of light on the stage.

Jones is also known for introducing to English audiences moving scenery through what is called 'machina versatilis', helping to create motion among a stable scene without any noticeable stagehands and of creating a representation of the ethereal.

These elements of stage design and of theatre production would later have influence beyond the English court, as those working in the public stage would take up these ideas and apply them to the early modern stage and for its larger audience.

== Architecture ==
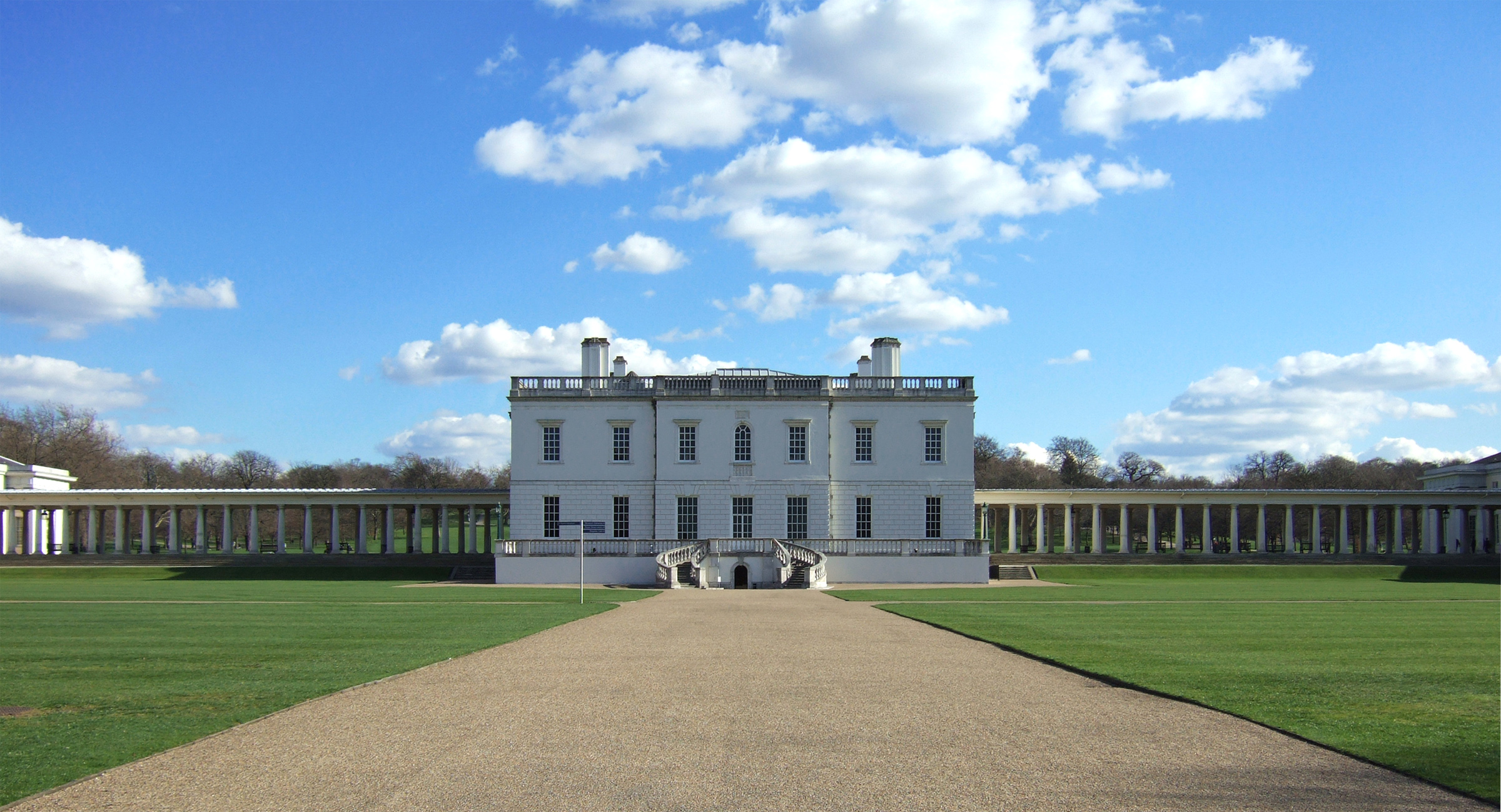
The Queen's House at Greenwich, facing the River Thames

In September 1615, Jones was appointed Surveyor-General of the King's Works, marking the beginning of Jones's career in earnest. Fortunately, both James I and Charles I spent lavishly on their buildings, contrasting hugely with the economical court of Elizabeth I. As the King's Surveyor, Jones built some of his key buildings in London. In 1616, work began on the Queen's House, Greenwich, for James I's wife, Anne. With the foundations laid and the first storey built, work stopped suddenly when Anne died in 1619. Jones provided a design for the queen's funeral hearse or catafalque, but it was not implemented. Work at Greenwich resumed in 1629, this time for Charles I's Queen, Henrietta Maria. It was finished in 1635 as the first strictly classical building in England, employing ideas found in the architecture of Palladio and ancient Rome. This is Jones's earliest-surviving work.

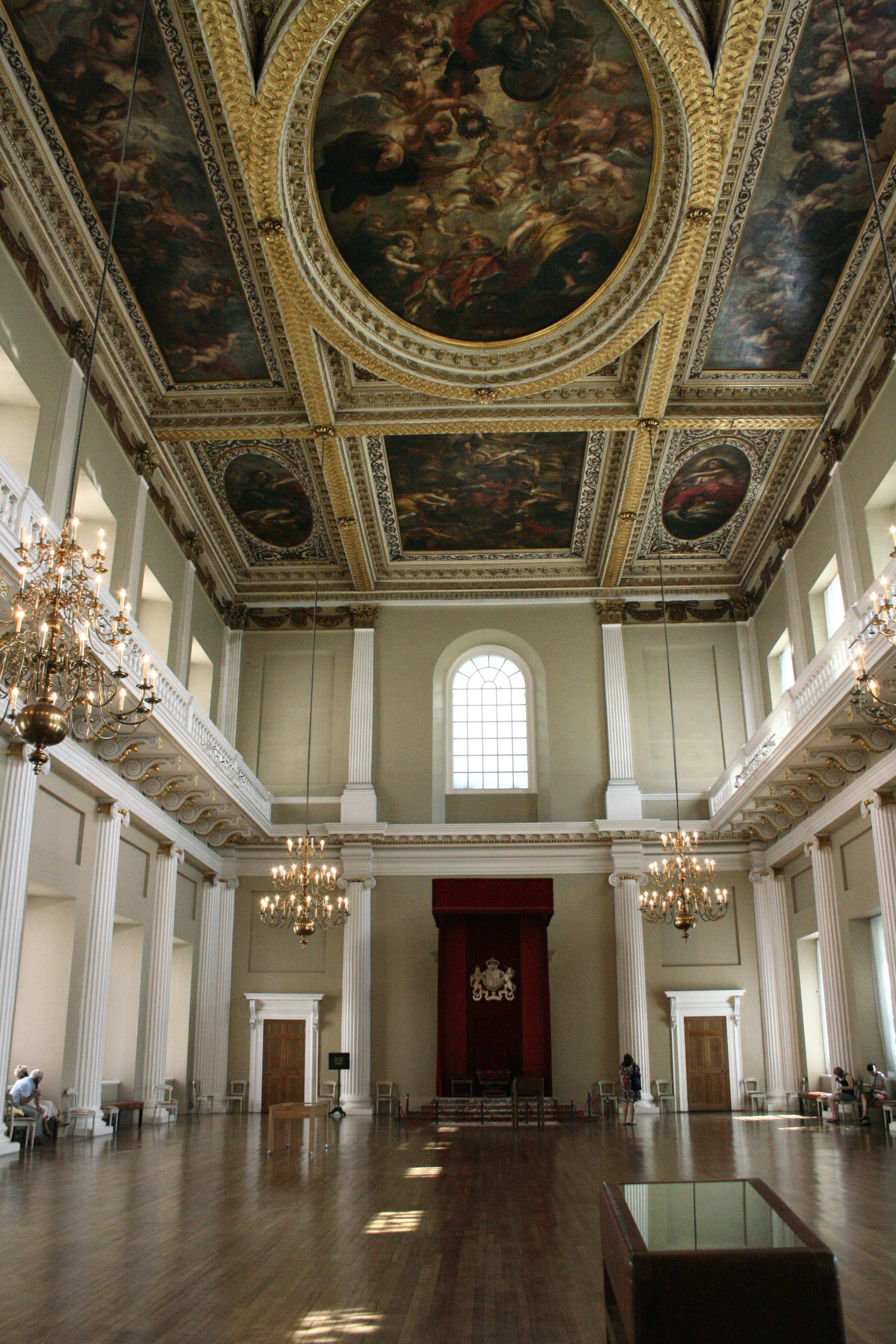
Interior of the Banqueting House in Whitehall, with its ceiling painted by Rubens

Between 1619 and 1622, the Banqueting House in the Palace of Whitehall was built, a design derived from buildings by Scamozzi and Palladio, to which a ceiling painted by Peter Paul Rubens was added several years later. The Whitehall palace was one of several projects where Jones worked with his personal assistant and nephew by marriage John Webb.

The Queen's Chapel, St. James's Palace, was built between 1623 and 1627, initially for Charles I's proposed bride, the Roman Catholic Infanta Maria Anna of Spain, and then for Charles I's wife, Henrietta Maria of France. Parts of the design originate in the Pantheon of ancient Rome and Jones evidently intended the church to evoke the Roman temple. These buildings show the realization of a mature architect with a confident grasp of classical principles and an intellectual understanding of how to implement them.

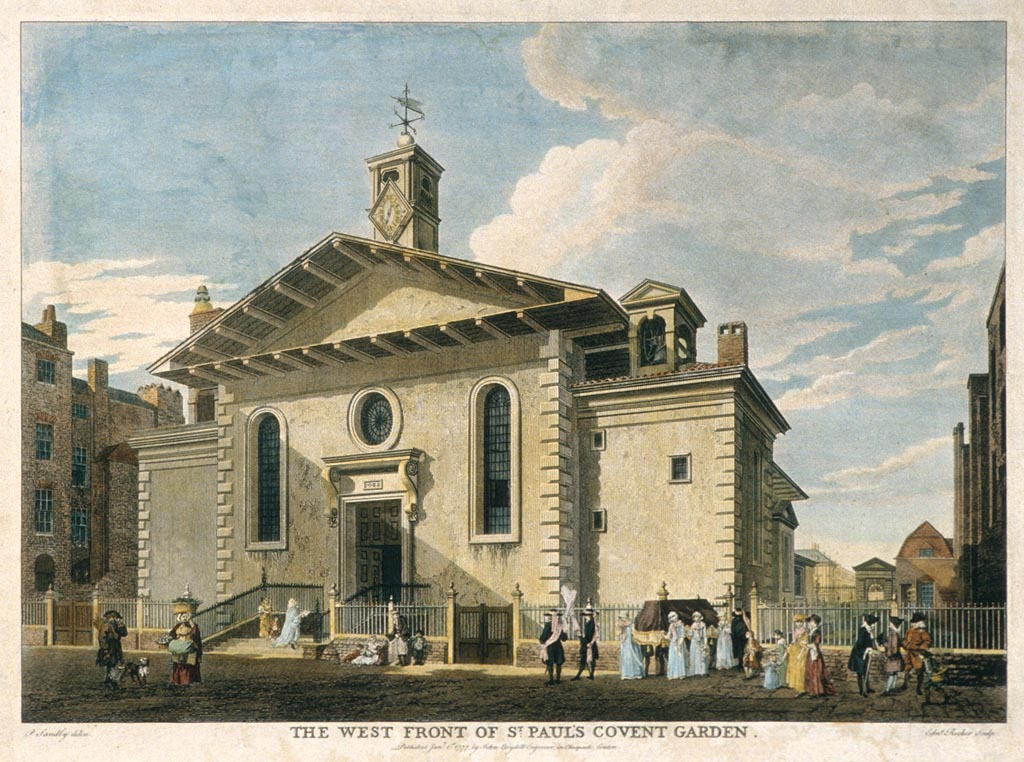
Church St Paul's, Covent Garden, 1766

The other project in which Jones was involved is the design of Covent Garden Square. He was commissioned by the Earl of Bedford to build a residential square, which he did along the lines of the Italian piazza of Livorno. It is the first regularly planned square in London. The Earl felt obliged to provide a church and he warned Jones that he wanted to economise. He told him to simply erect a "barn" and Jones's oft-quoted response was that his lordship would have "the finest barn in Europe". In the design of St Paul's, Jones faithfully adhered to Vitruvius's design for a Tuscan temple and it was the first wholly and authentically classical church built in England. The inside of St Paul's, Covent Garden was gutted by fire in 1795, but externally it remains much as Jones designed it and dominates the west side of the piazza.

Jones also designed the square of Lincoln's Inn Fields, and a house in the square, the Lindsey House built in 1640, is often attributed to Jones. Its design of a rusticated ground floor with giant pilasters above supporting the entablature and balustrade served as a model for other town houses in London such as John Nash's Regent's Park terraces, as well as in other English and Welsh towns such as Bath's Royal Crescent.

Another large project Jones undertook was the repair and remodelling of St Paul's Cathedral. Between the years of 1634 and 1642, Jones wrestled with the dilapidated Gothicism of Old St Paul's, casing it in classical masonry and totally redesigning the west front. Jones incorporated the giant scrolls from Vignola and della Porta's Church of the Gesù with a giant Corinthian portico, the largest of its type north of the Alps, but the church would be destroyed in the Great Fire of London in 1666. Also around this time, circa 1638, Jones devised drawings completely redesigning the Palace of Whitehall, but the execution of these designs was frustrated by Charles I's financial and political difficulties.

More than 1000 buildings have been attributed to Jones but only a very small number of those are certain to be his work. According to architecture historian John Summerson, the modern concept of an architect's artistic responsibility for a building did not exist at that time, and Jones's role in many instances may be that of a civil servant in getting things done rather than as an architect. Jones's contribution to a building may also simply be verbal instructions to a mason or bricklayer and providing an Italian engraving or two as a guide, or the correction of drafts. In the 1630s, Jones was in high demand and, as Surveyor to the King, his services were only available to a very limited circle of people, so often projects were commissioned to other members of the Works. Stoke Bruerne Park in Northamptonshire was built by Sir Francis Crane, "receiving the assistance of Inigo Jones", between 1629 and 1635. Jones is also thought to have been involved in another country house, this time in Wiltshire. Wilton House was renovated from about 1630 onwards, at times worked on by Jones, then passed on to Isaac de Caus when Jones was too busy with royal clients. He then returned in 1646 with his student, John Webb, to try and complete the project. Contemporary equivalent architects included Sir Balthazar Gerbier and Nicholas Stone.

One of Jones's designs is the "double cube" room at Wilton, and it was also the foundation stone of his status as the father of British architecture. Jones, as the pioneer in his era, had strong influence during their time. His revolutionary ideas even effect beyond the Court circle, and today, many scholars believe that he also started the golden age of British architecture.

== Political and civic life ==
On 16 February 1621, in a by-election caused by the ejection of an existing member Sir John Leedes, Jones was elected M.P. in the Parliament of England for New Shoreham in West Sussex, a borough constituency controlled by the Earl of Arundel, and sat till the dissolution of that parliament in February 1622. He was named to a committee to improve lighting and increase seating in the House of Commons' chamber, resulting in a new gallery being erected in St Stephen's Chapel during the summer recess and was also responsible for a new ceiling put in the House of Lords chamber in 1623. He also served as a Justice of the Peace (J.P.) for the county of Middlesex and borough of Westminster from 1630 until at least 1640. He was made a freeman of the borough of Southampton in 1623 and in 1633 was offered, but declined, a knighthood by Charles I.

== Later life ==
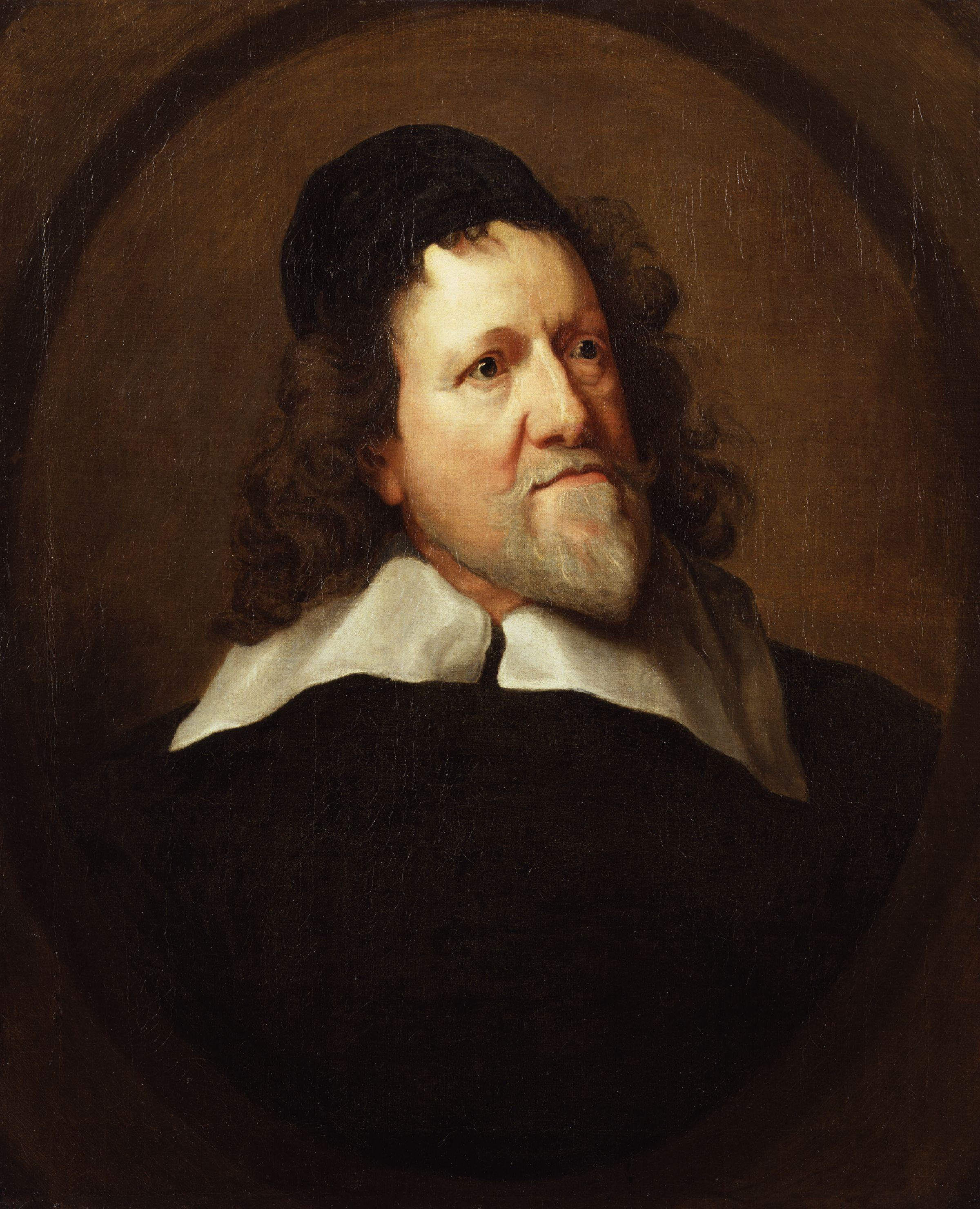
Inigo Jones, by Anthony van Dyck

Jones's full-time career effectively ended with the outbreak of the English Civil War in 1642 and the seizure of the King's houses in 1643. Jones was captured at the third siege of Basing House in October 1645. Unfortunately, as one of the last great strongholds to the Cavaliers, the great mansion inside was destroyed by Cromwell's army and even the walls were broken into many pieces. His property was later returned to him (c. 1646) but Jones ended his days, unmarried, living in Somerset House. He was, however, closely involved in the design of Coleshill House, in Berkshire, for the Pratt family, which he visited with the young apprentice architect Roger Pratt, to fix a new site for the proposed mansion. He died on 21 June 1652 and was buried with his parents at St Benet's, Paul's Wharf, the Welsh church of the City of London. John Denham and then Christopher Wren followed him as King's Surveyor of Works. A monument dedicated to him in the church, portraying St Paul's Cathedral and other buildings, was destroyed in the Great Fire in 1666.

== Legacy ==
Jones was an influence on a number of 18th-century architects, notably Lord Burlington and William Kent. There is an Inigo Jones Road in Charlton, southeast London (SE7), near Charlton House, some of whose features were allegedly designed by him.

A bridge in Llanrwst, North Wales, built in 1636 and named "Pont Fawr" is also known locally as "Pont Inigo Jones" (Inigo Jones's Bridge). R. F. Gould said he was responsible for the Masonic "Inigo Jones Manuscript", from around 1607, a document of the Old Charges of Freemasonry.

== List of architectural works ==
- Design for the completion of the central tower, old St Paul's Cathedral, not executed (c. 1608)
- Design for the New Exchange in the Strand, London, not executed (c.1608)
- The Queen's House, Greenwich (1616–1619), work suspended on the death of Anne of Denmark completed (1630–1635) for Henrietta Maria of France
- Design for the Star Chamber building, not executed (1617)
- Gateway at Oatlands Palace (1617), now at Chiswick House
- Gateway at Arundel House (1618), demolished
- Banqueting House, Whitehall (1619–22)
- Prince's Lodging, Newmarket for Henry Frederick, Prince of Wales (1619), demolished
- The Queen's Chapel, St. James's Palace (1623–27), for Henrietta Maria of France
- Fort Amsterdam (1625) – The Dutch East India Company asked Jones to design a stone fortification on the Hudson River, which he did, but the fort was built (by Cryn Fredericks) out of wood instead and was torn down in 1790.
- The Cockpit Theatre, Palace of Whitehall (1629) demolished
- Stoke Park Pavilions, Northamptonshire, attributed (c. 1629–35)
- Somerset House Chapel (1630–35), demolished
- Covent Garden, London, houses on the north and east side as well as St Paul's, Covent Garden on the west (1631–1637) only the church survives
- Old St Paul's Cathedral, new west front and remodelling of the nave and transepts (1634–42) destroyed in the Great Fire of London
- Wilton House, Wiltshire (1636–40) the interior burnt c.1647, rebuilt to the designs of John Webb (1648)
- Sir Peter Killigrew's House, Blackfriars, London (1630s) not known if built
- Palace of Whitehall, various schemes for the complete rebuilding of the palace (c. 1637–39)
- Lord Maltravers's House, Lothbury, London (1638) if built destroyed in the Great Fire of London
- Temple Bar, London, design for a triumphal arch, not executed (1638)
- Screen in Winchester Cathedral (c.1638), removed by the dean in 1820, and its central portion is now found in the Museum of Archaeology and Anthropology, Cambridge, incorporated into the building as an architectural feature.
- Design for a row of houses in Lothbury for Thomas Howard, 21st Earl of Arundel (c.1638), destroyed in the Great Fire of London
- Lindsey House, Lincoln's Inn Fields now numbers 59 & 60, attributed (c. 1638–40)
- Milton Manor House, Milton, Abingdon, Oxfordshire
- Coleshill House, Berkshire (designed by Jones and executed by Roger Pratt)
- Chesterton Windmill, Warwickshire (assisted his pupil John Stone with the design)

== Gallery of architectural works ==
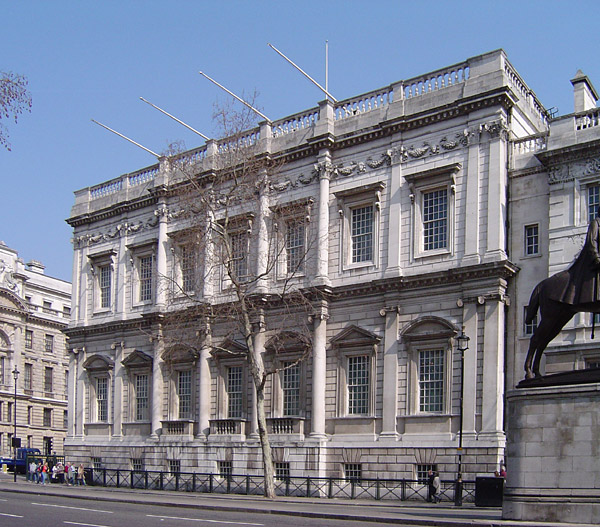
Banqueting House Whitehall

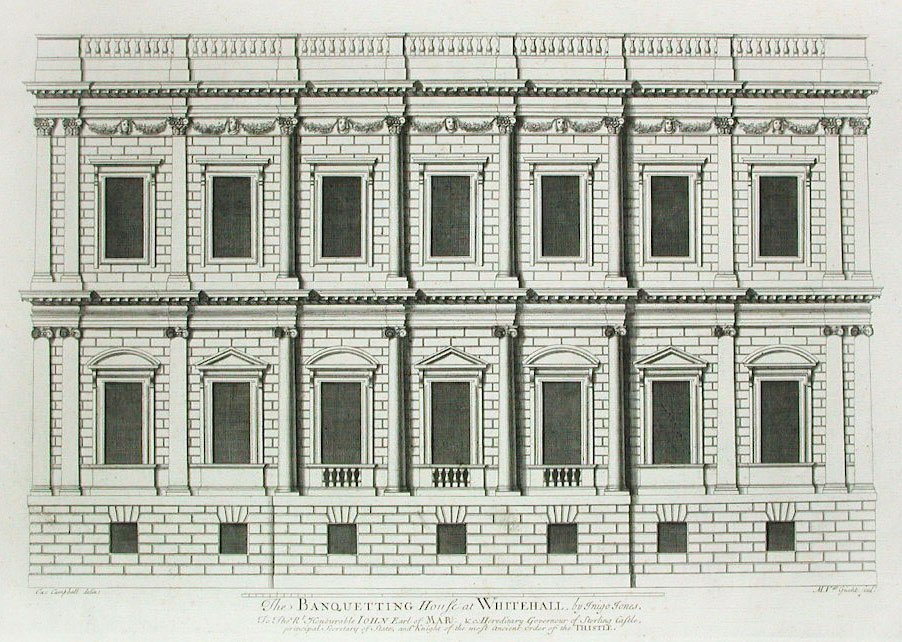
Banqueting House Whitehall

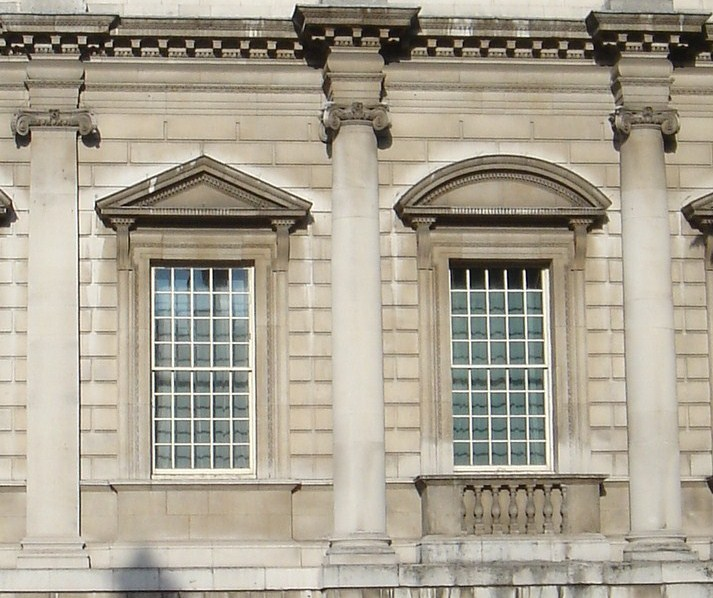
Detail of the Banqueting House Whitehall

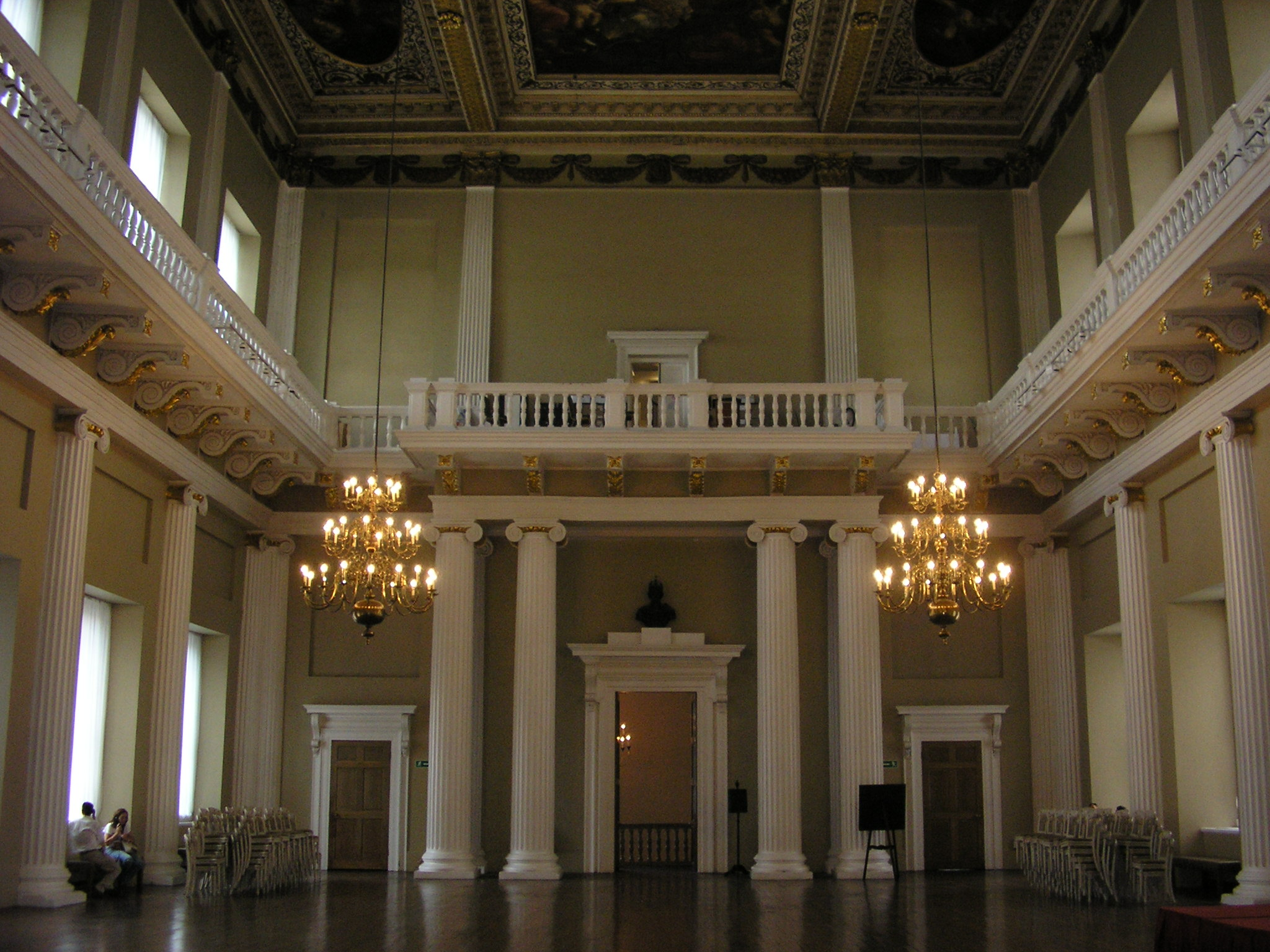
Interior looking north, Banqueting House Whitehall

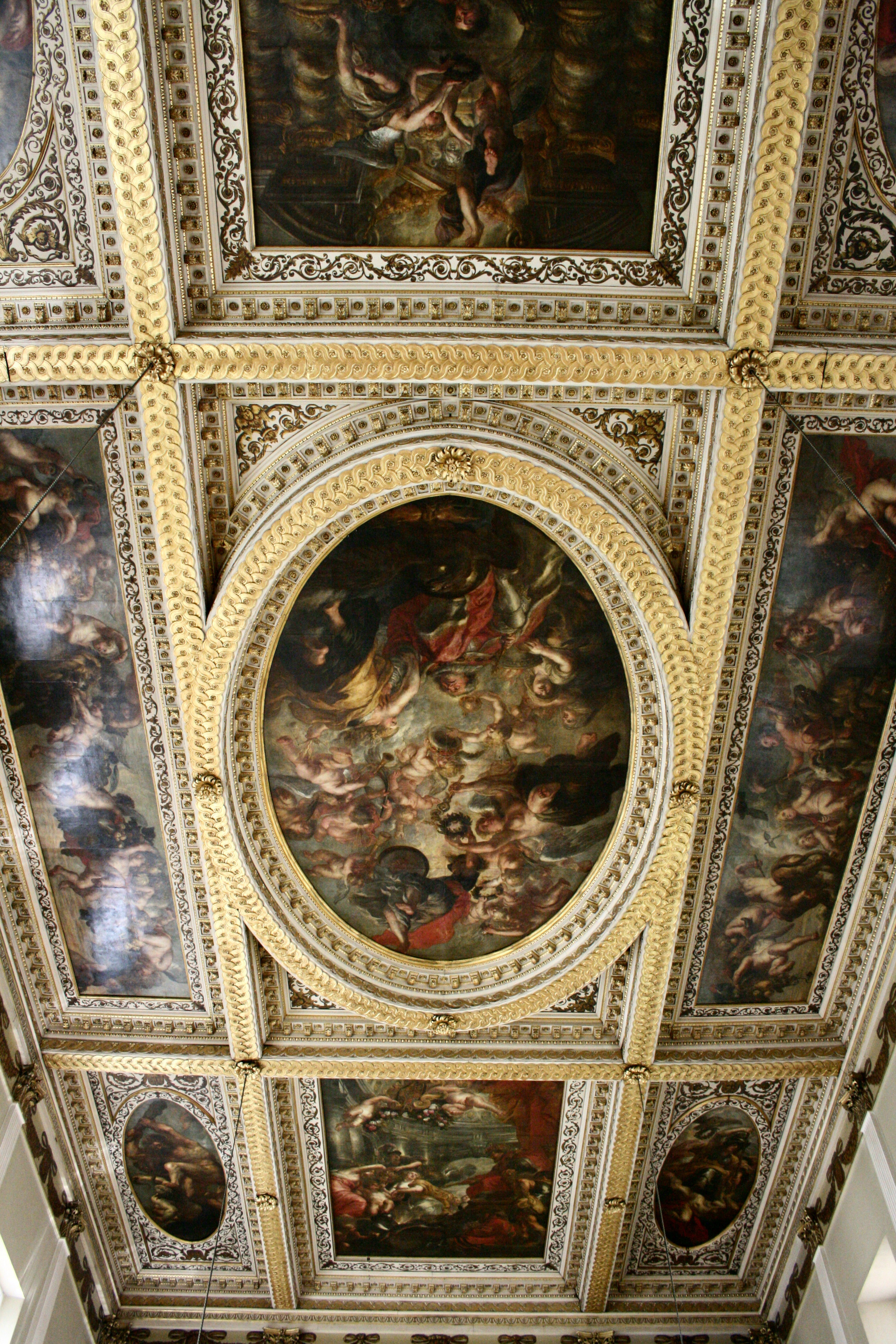
Ceiling, with Rubens paintings, Banqueting House Whitehall

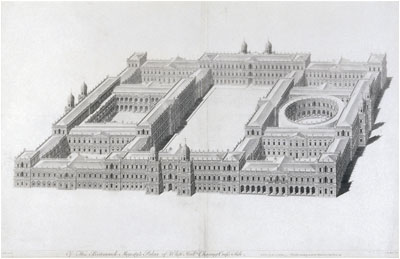
Design to rebuild Whitehall Palace

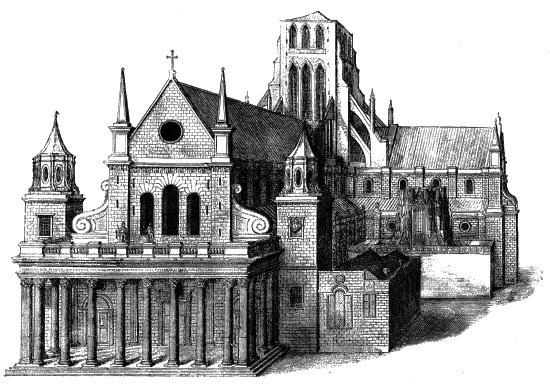
West front, nave and transepts, Old St. Paul's Cathedral, as remodelled by Jones

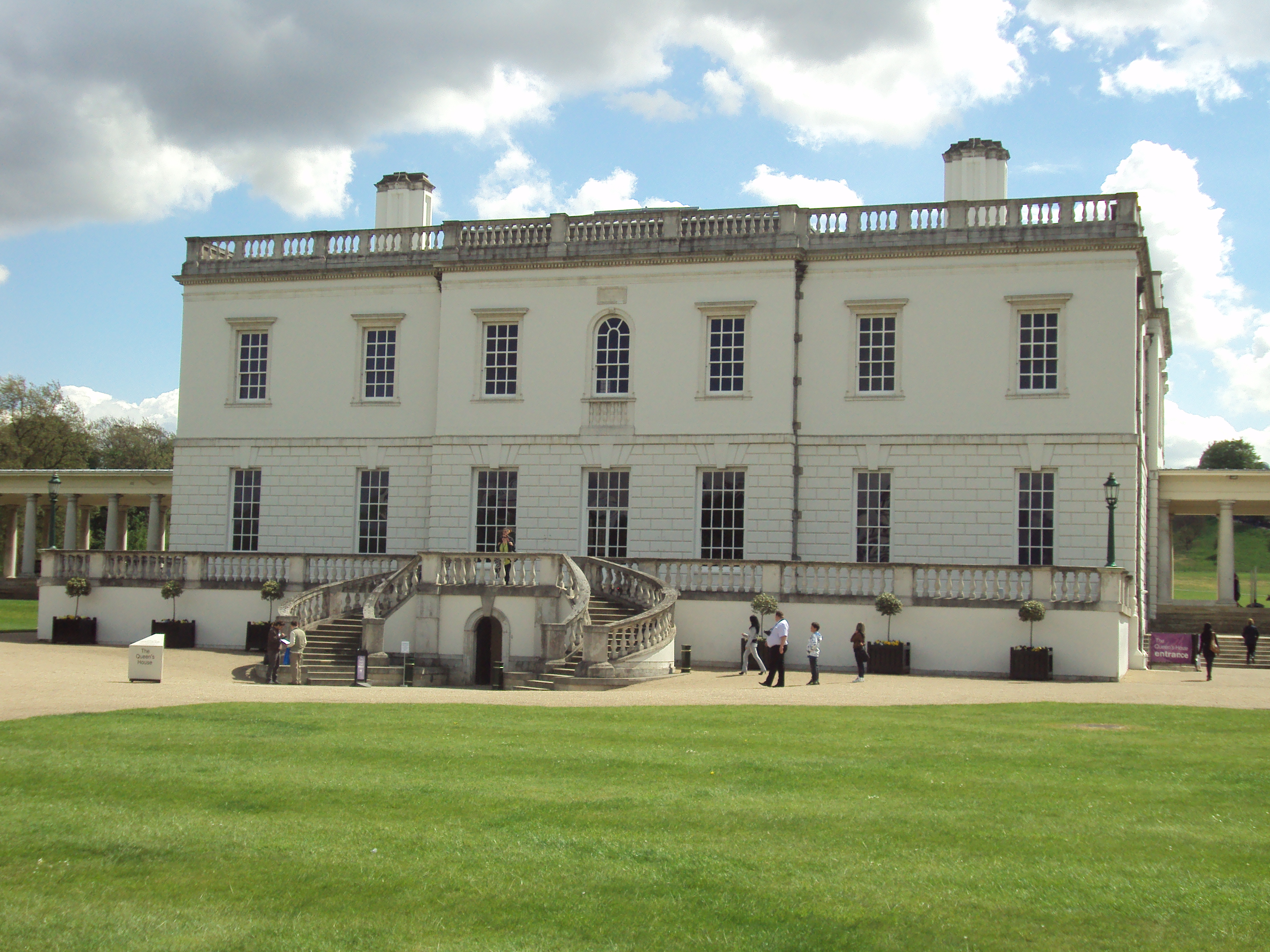
North front, The Queen's House, Greenwich

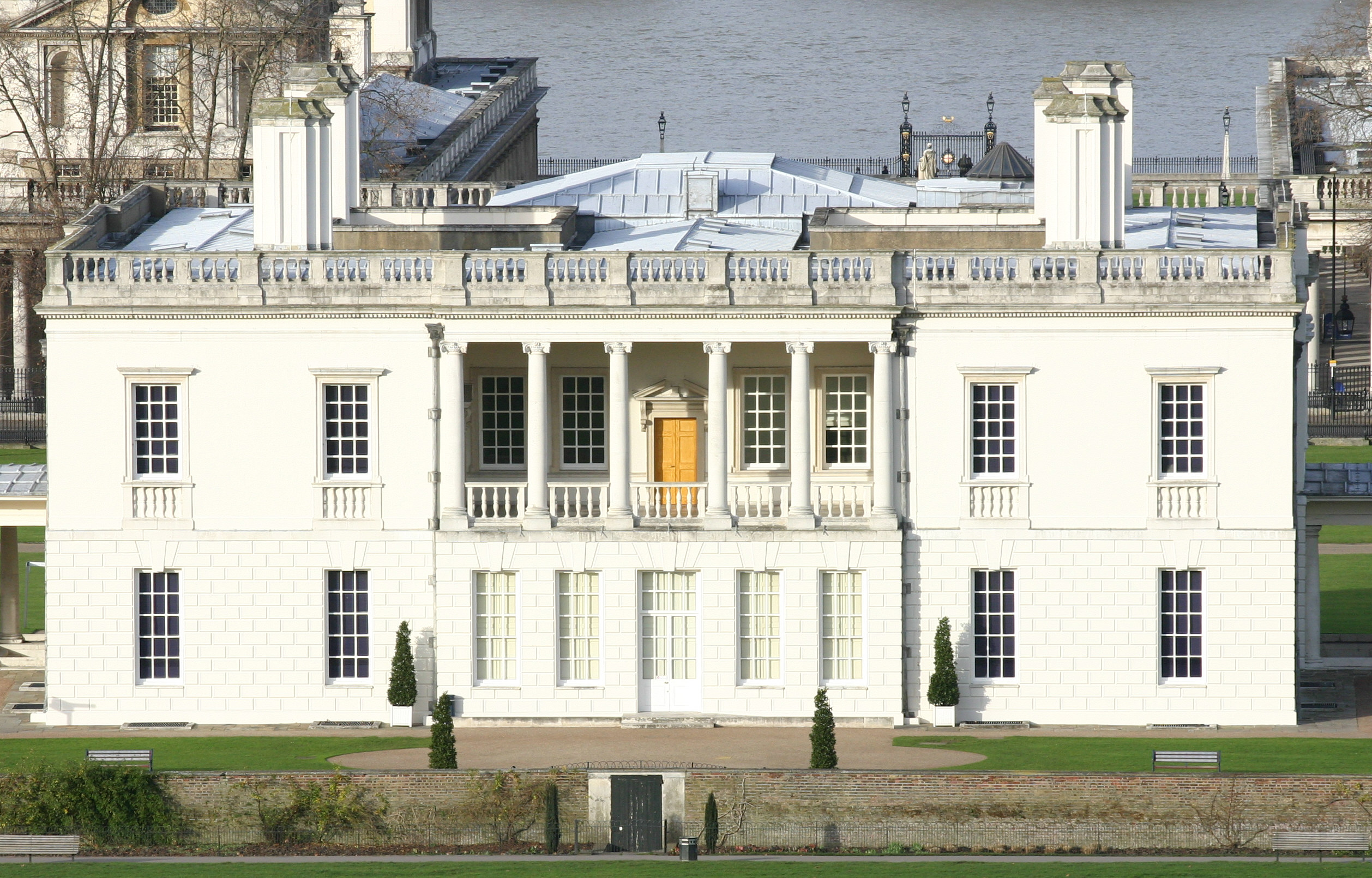
South front, The Queen's House, Greenwich

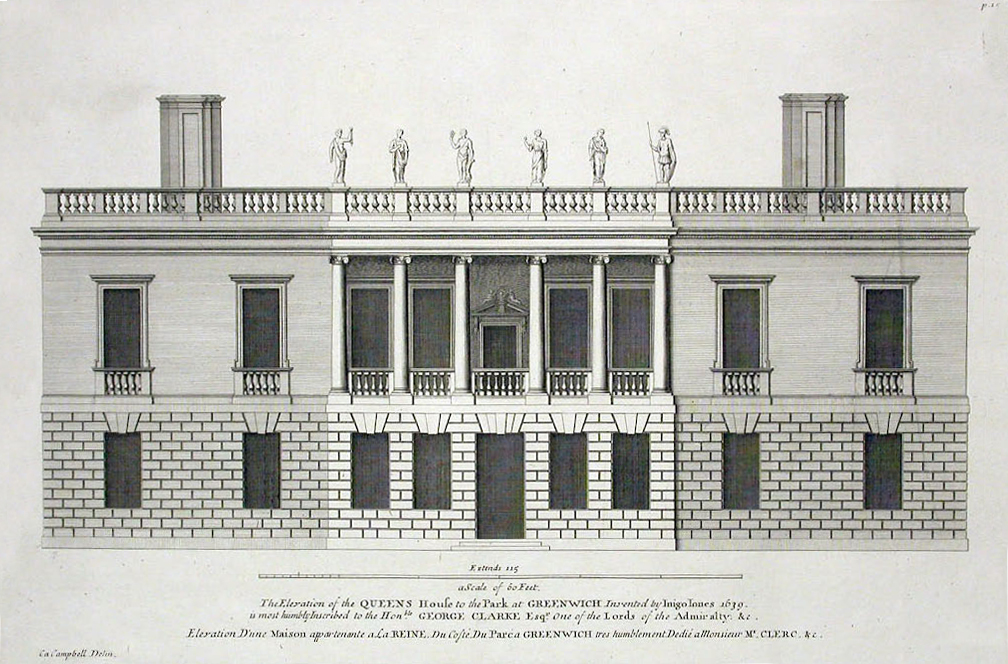
South front, The Queen's House, Greenwich

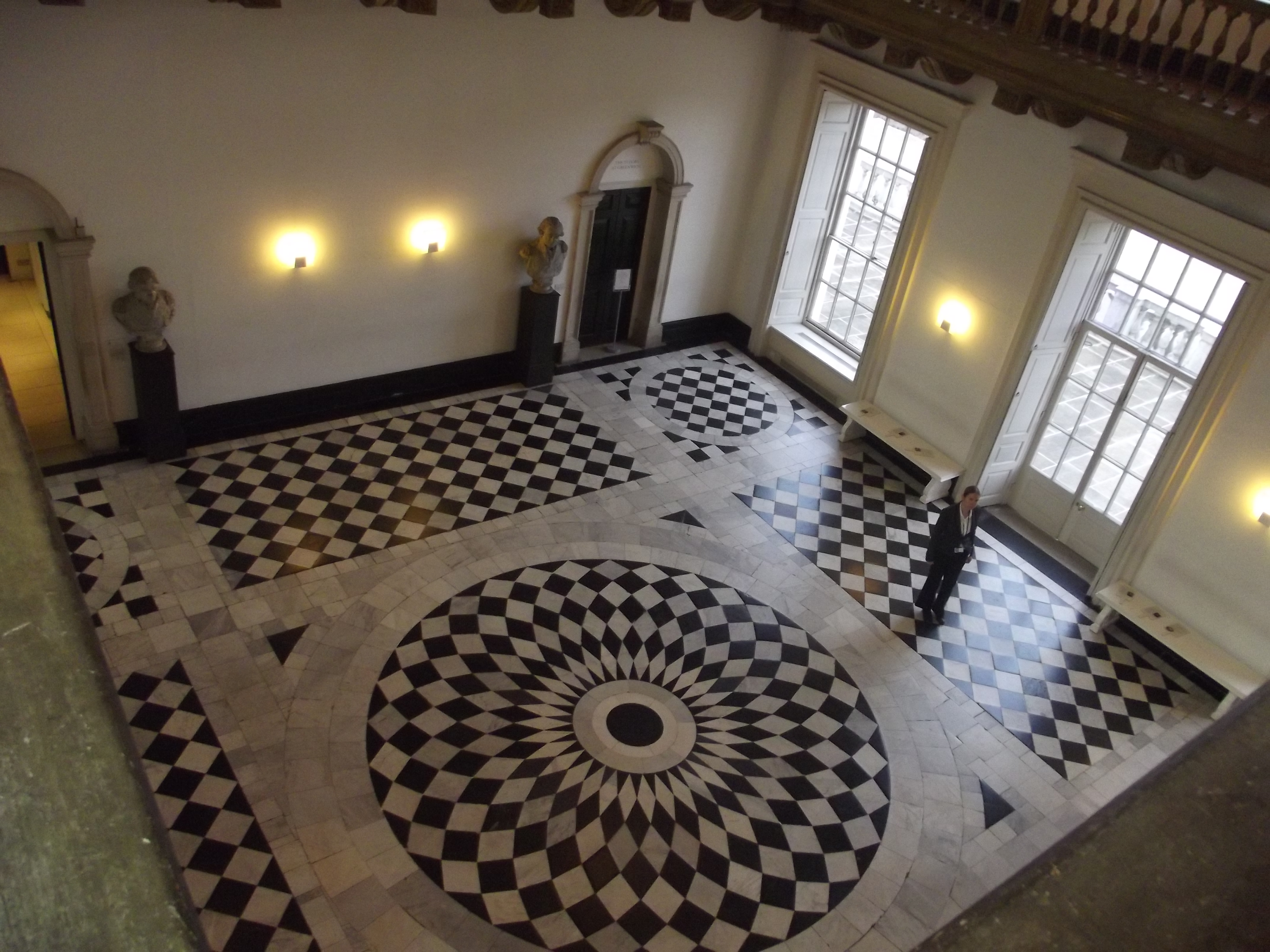
Great Hall, The Queen's House, Greenwich

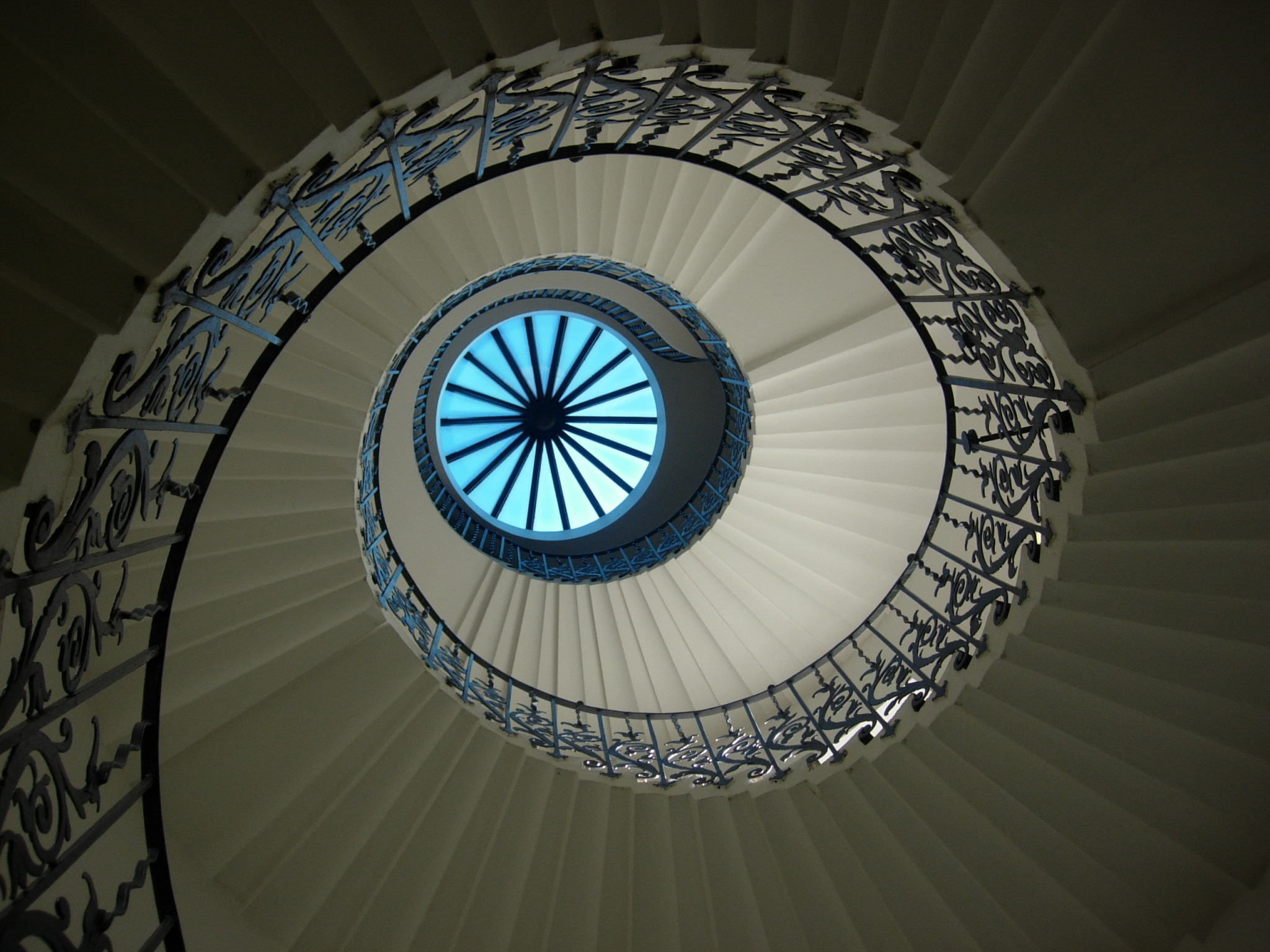
Tulip Stair, The Queen's House, Greenwich

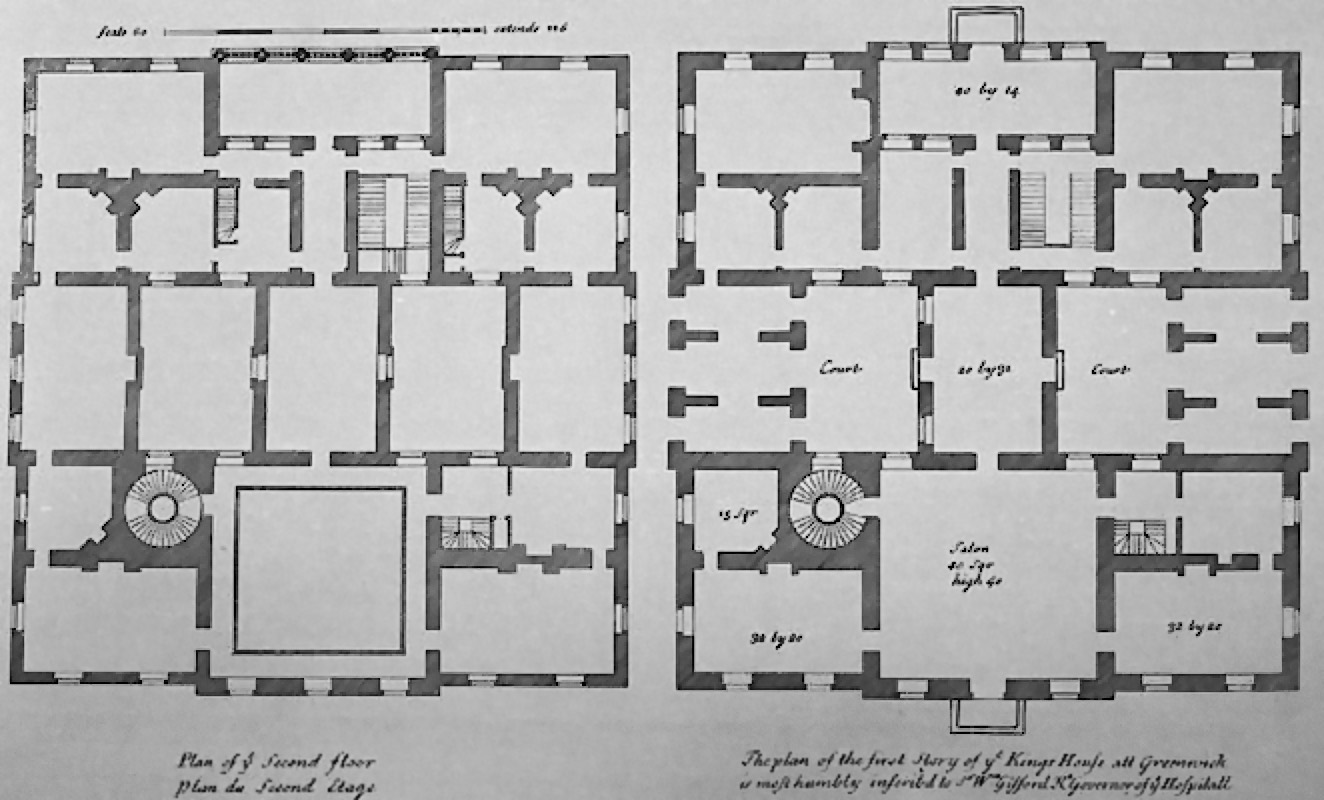
Plan, The Queen's House, Greenwich

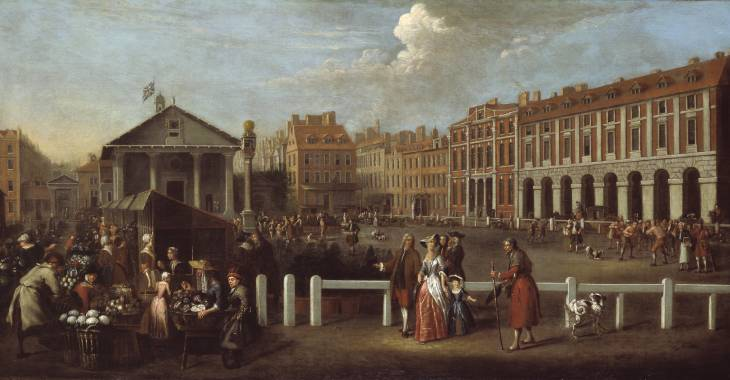
Covent Garden

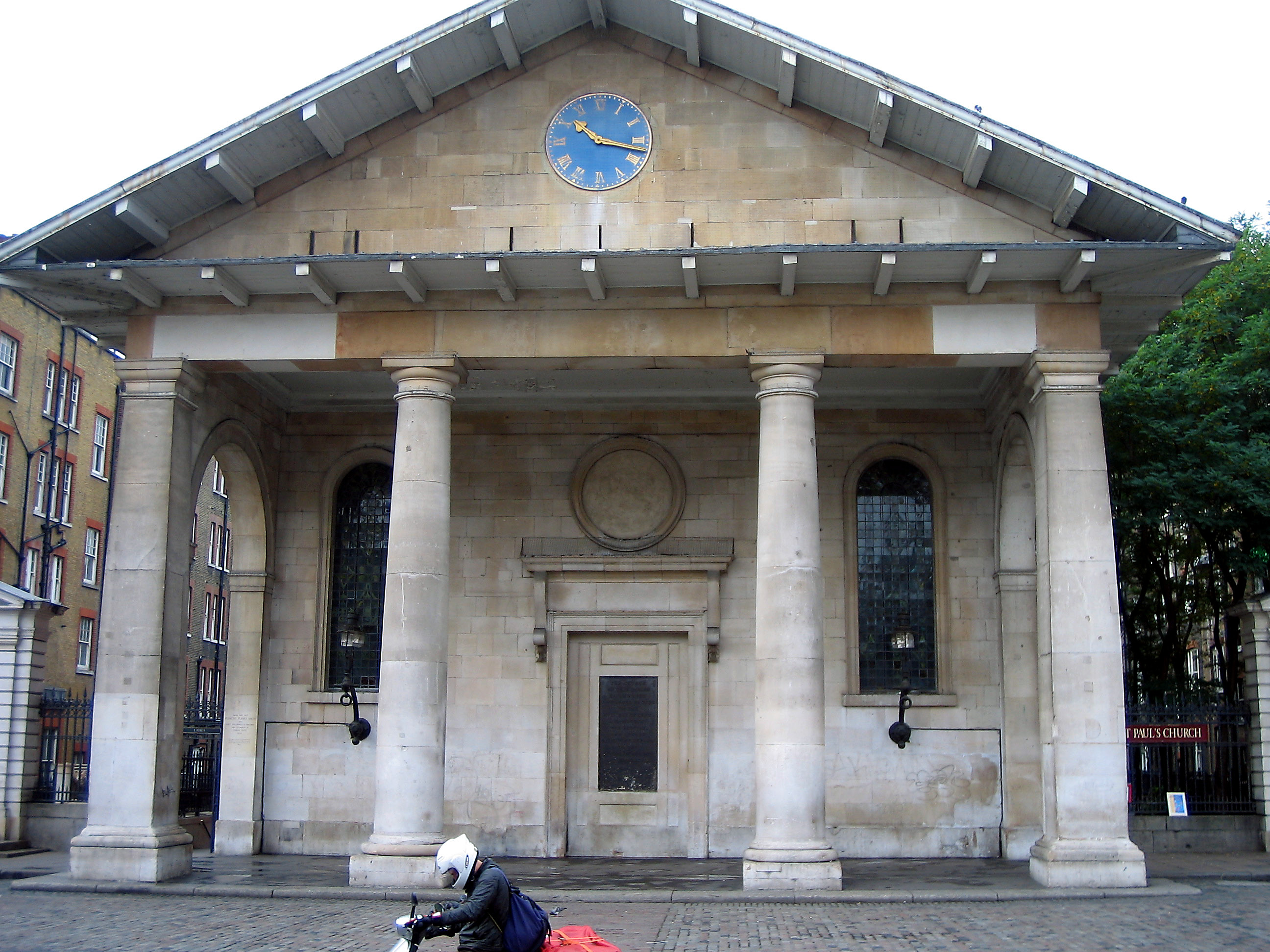
St. Paul's Covent Garden

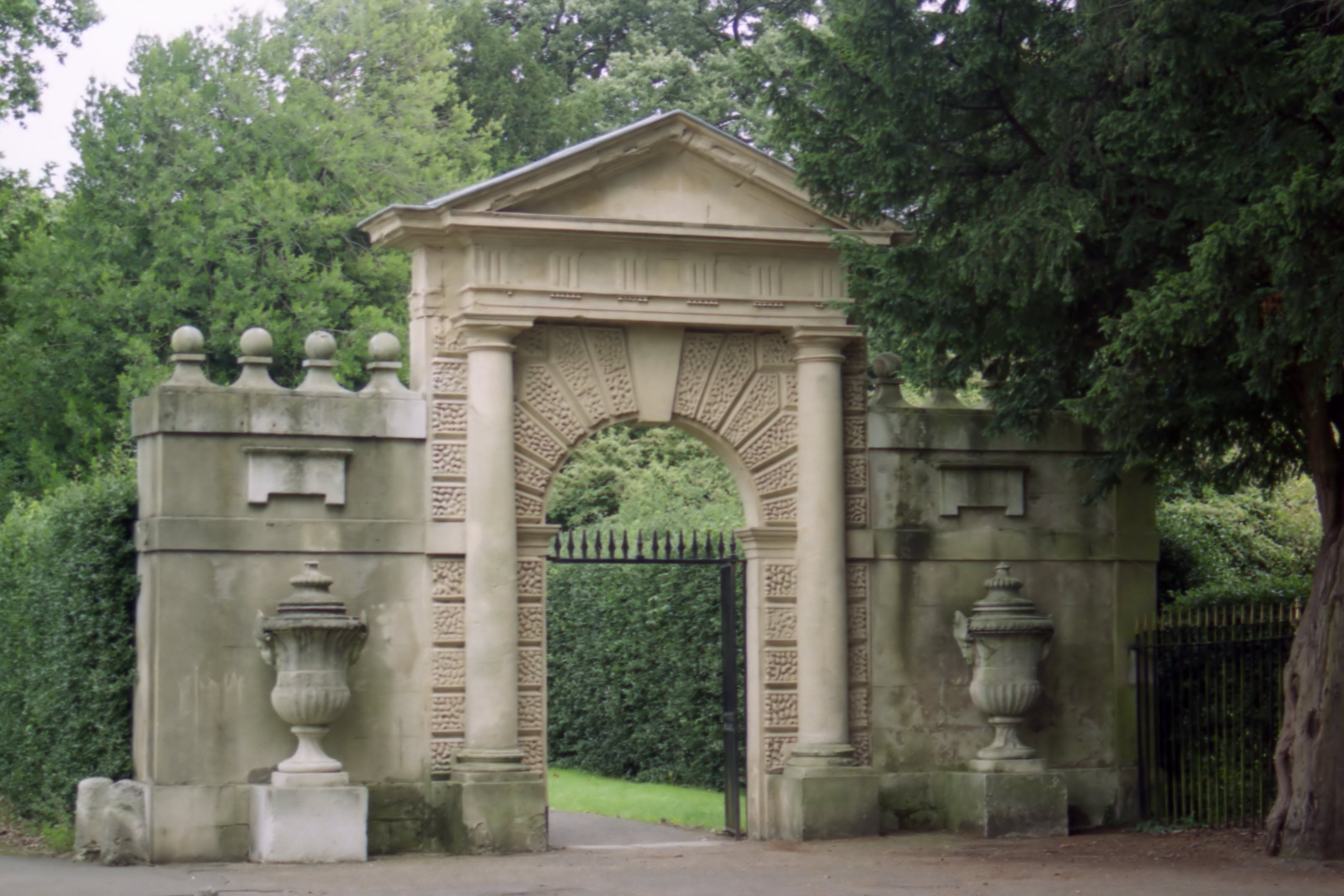
Gateway from Oatlands, now at Chiswick House

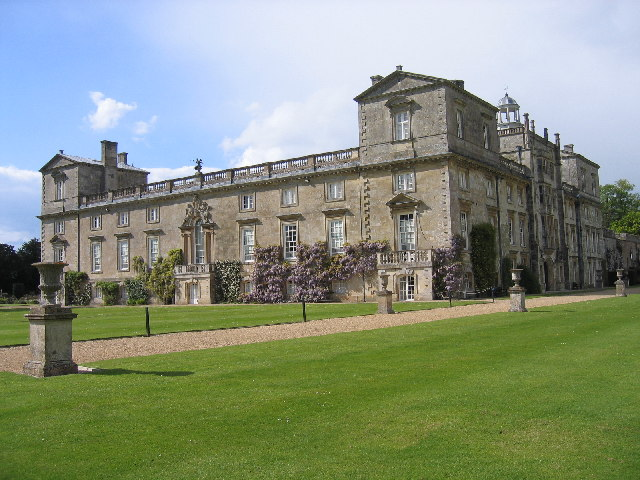
Wilton House, Wiltshire

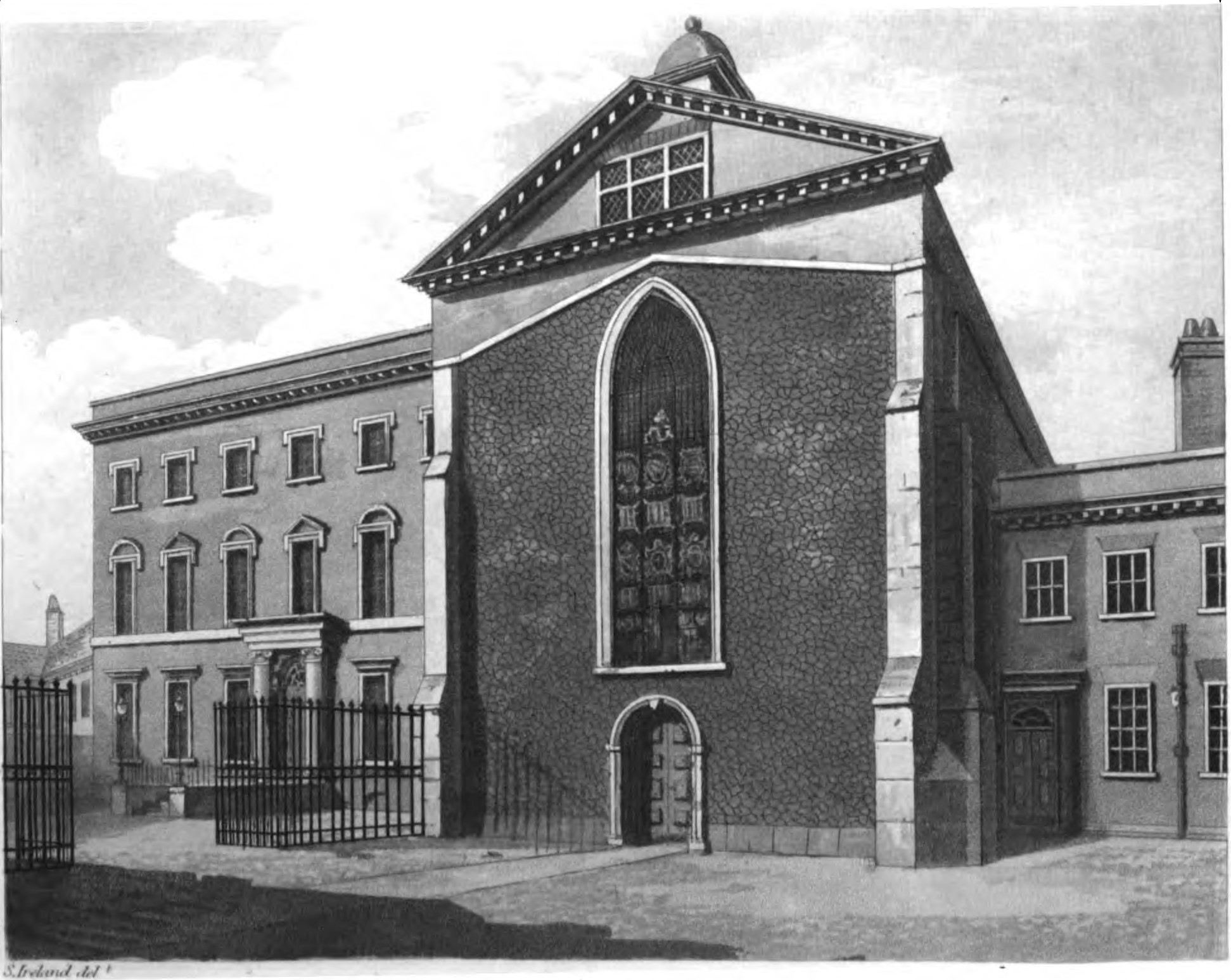
Rolls Chapel and Rolls House, now part of Maughan Library, King's College London

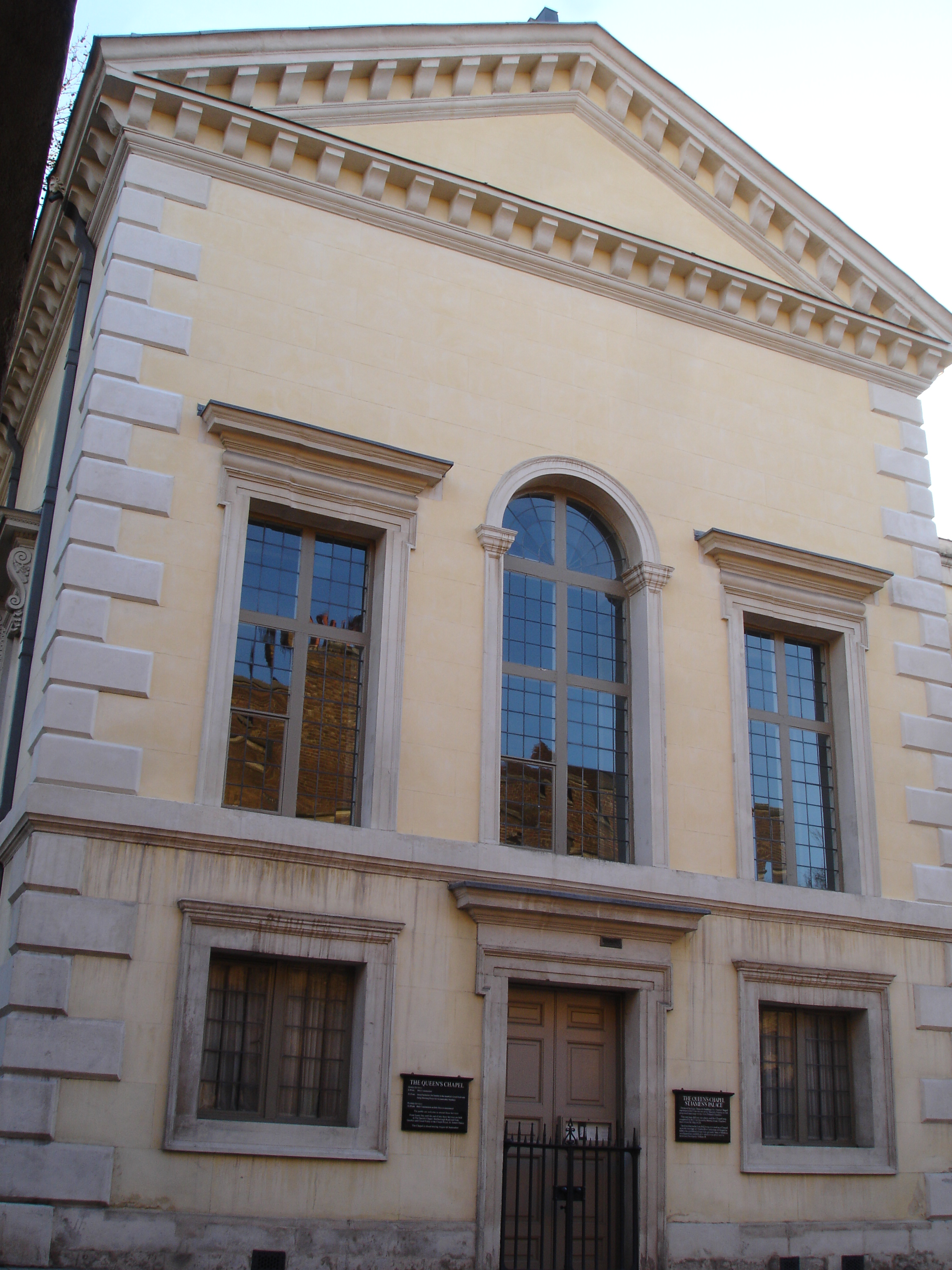
Queen's Chapel, St. James Palace, London

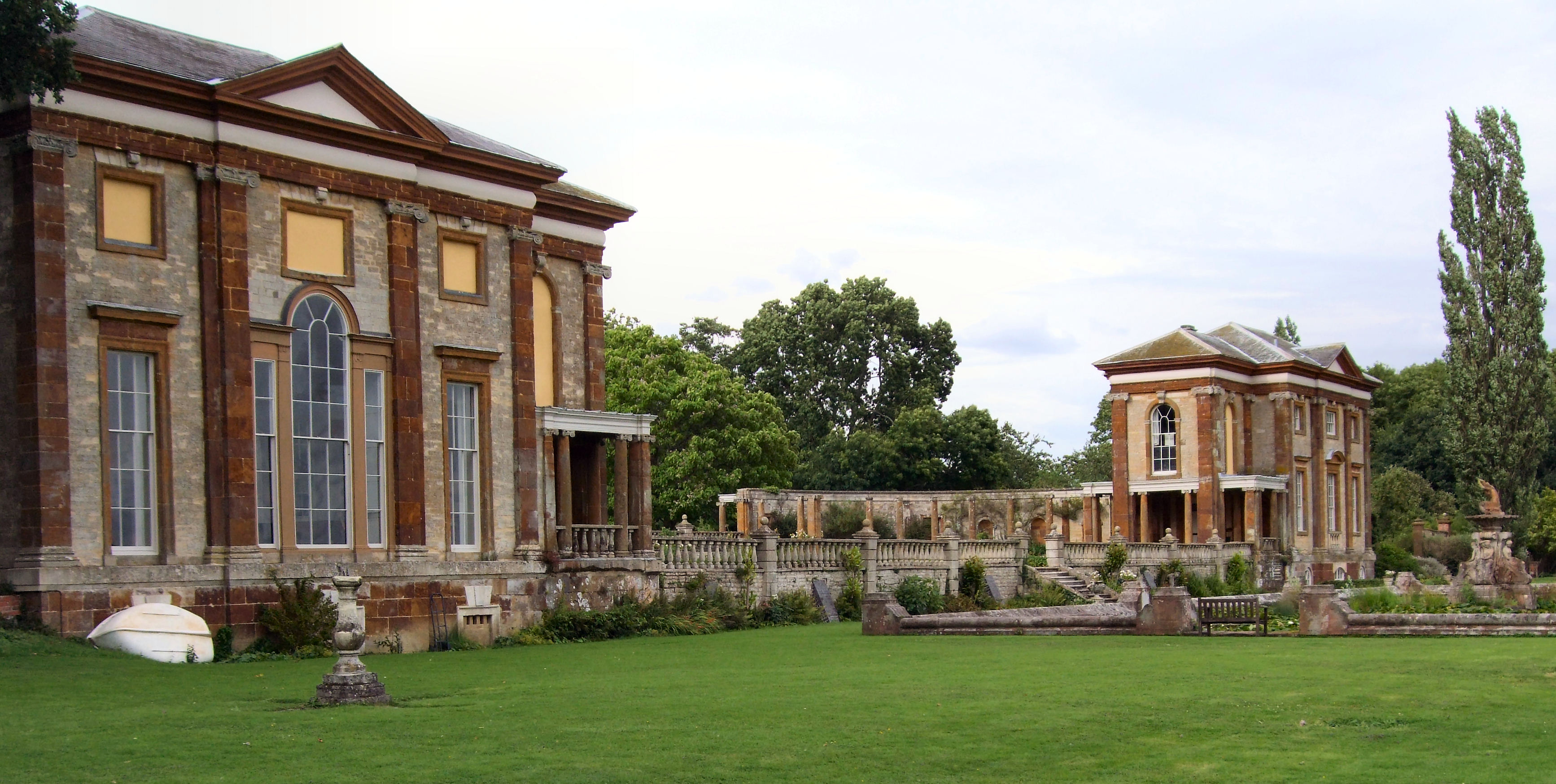
Stoke Park, attributed

== See also ==
- List of architects
- Lists of people from London

== Sources ==
- Anderson, Christy (2007). Inigo Jones and the classical tradition. Cambridge: Cambridge University Press. ISBN 978-0-521-82027-1. OCLC 67375135.
- Chaney, Edward (1998). The evolution of the grand tour: Anglo-Italian cultural relations since the Renaissance. London: Frank Cass. ISBN 0-7146-4577-X. OCLC 38304358.
- Edward, Chaney (2003). "Evelyn, Inigo Jones, and the Collector Earl of Arundel". In Harris, Frances; Hunter, Michael (eds.). John Evelyn and his milieu. London: British Library. pp. 37–60. ISBN 978-0-7123-6360-0. OCLC 645917819.
- Edward, Chaney (2006). Inigo Jones's "Roman sketchbook". London: Roxburghe Club. ISBN 0-901953-12-1. OCLC 76978073.
- Chaney, Edward (2011). "Roma Britannica and the Cultural Memory of Egypt: Lord Arundel and the Obelisk of Domitian". In Marshall, David Ryley; Russell, Susan; Wolfe, Karin Elizabeth (eds.). Roma Britannica : art patronage and cultural exchange in eighteenth-century Rome. London: British School at Rome. pp. 147–170. ISBN 978-0-904152-55-5. OCLC 731728128.
- Chaney, Edward; Wilks, Timothy (2013). The Jacobean Grand Tour: Early Stuart Travellers in Europe. London: I.B. Tauris. ISBN 978-0-85773-531-7. OCLC 892799515.
- Colvin, Howard, "A Biographical Dictionary of British Architects: 1600 to 1840", 1954
- Gotch, A J, "Inigo Jones", 1968.
- Hart, Vaughan (1994). Art and magic in the court of the Stuarts. London: Routledge. ISBN 0-203-20078-0. OCLC 243606208.
- Hart, Vaughan (1995). "Imperial Seat or Ecumenical Temple? On Inigo Jones's use of 'Decorum' at St Paul's Cathedral". Architectura. 25 (2): 194–213.
- Hart, Vaughan (2011). Inigo Jones: the architect of kings. New Haven: Yale University Press. ISBN 978-0-300-14149-8. OCLC 706965857.
- Hart, Vaughan; Tucker, Richard (March 2001). ""Immaginacy Set Free": Aristotelian Ethics and Inigo Jones's Banqueting House at Whitehall". Res: Anthropology and Aesthetics. 39: 151–167. doi:10.1086/RESv39n1ms20167527. ISSN 0277-1322. S2CID 169066726.
- Hart, Vaughan; Tucker, Richard (2002). "Ornament and the work of Inigo Jones". Architectura. 32: 36–52.
- Leapman, Michael (2003). Inigo: the troubled life of Inigo Jones, architect of the English Renaissance. London: Headline Book Publishing. ISBN 0-7553-1002-0. OCLC 52358668.
- Orgel, Stephen; Strong, Roy C. (1973). The theatre of the Stuart Court : including the complete designs for productions at court, for the most part in the Collection of the Duke of Devonshire, together with their texts and historical documentation. London: Sotheby Parke Bernet. ISBN 0-520-02469-9. OCLC 873803.
- Worsley, Giles (2007). Inigo Jones and the European classicist tradition. New Haven: Yale University Press. ISBN 978-0-300-11729-5. OCLC 61821817.
