= Peter Hicks =

British historian and church musician (born 1964)

Peter Geoffrey Barry Hicks
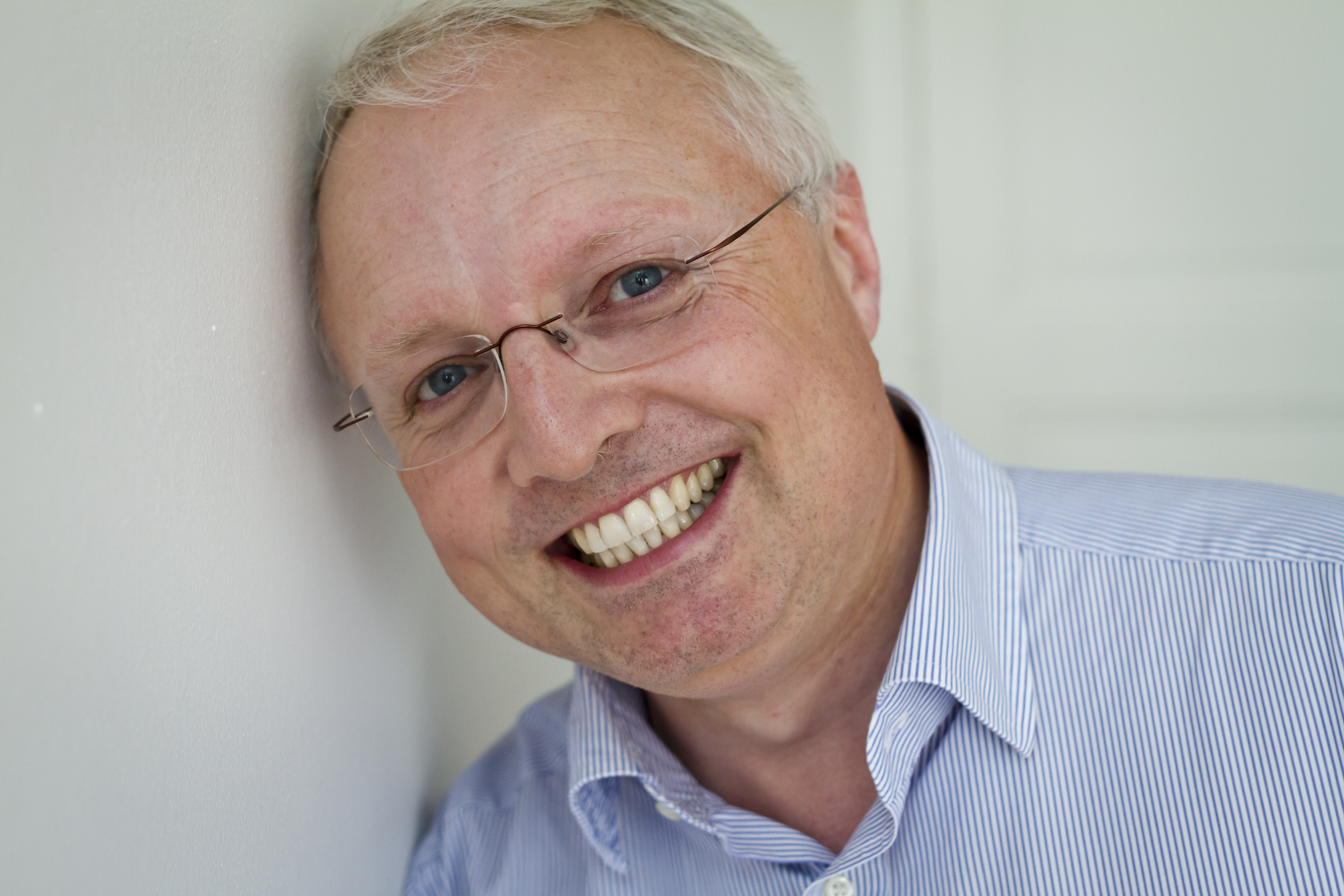
- Born: 1 February 1964 (age 62); Wallsend-upon-Tyne, Northumberland, England
- Education: University College London; St John's College, Cambridge
- Occupations: Historian at the Fondation Napoleon; church musician
- Writing career
- Language: English, French, Italian

Peter Geoffrey Barry Hicks (born 1 February 1964) is a British historian and church musician.

== Biography ==
Born in Wallsend-upon-Tyne, then in Northumberland, Hicks is the son of Anglican priest Richard Barry Hicks and schoolteacher Jennifer Margaret Eames. After completing a degree in classics at University College London from 1982 to 1985 and a year of study at Sapienza University of Rome's Istituto di Paleografia, he studied for a PhD at St John's College, Cambridge. Hicks was a lettore (language assistant) at the University of Pavia in 1990-1991 whilst being St John's exchange student at Collegio Ghislieri in Pavia, and began working as a historian for the Foundation Napoleon in 1997. He was appointed visiting research fellow (a post held from 1997 to 2007), and he became a visiting professor at the University of Bath in 2007. In 2006, Hicks was appointed an honorary fellow at Florida State University's Institute on Napoleon and the French Revolution. He was appointed to the editorial board of St Andrews Studies in French History and Culture in 2011, and was invited to become director of the Massena Society in 2013. In 2008, Hicks was appointed by the Provincia di Alessandria to the advisory committee for the creation of the Marengo Museum in Alessandria, Italy. He is on the editorial boards of the international journals Albertiana and Napoleonica La Revue.

Hicks was organist and choirmaster at the Anglican church in Riding Mill, Northumberland in 1981-1982, and directed the choir of the Anglican church in Milan until 1991. He moved to France that year, becoming director of music at St George’s Anglican Church in Paris, and pursued a career as a singer and choir director. He is the music director of the Paris choir Musicanti.

== Education ==
Peter Hicks received a bachelor's degree from London University in 1985. During the 1985-1986 academic year, he completed a Greek paleography course at the University of Rome's La Sapienza. Hicks received a doctoral degree, on the manuscript tradition of Greek bucolic poems during the Renaissance, at Cambridge University's St. John's College in 1993.

== Prizes ==
Hicks was nominated for the 2007 RIBA International Book Award for Architecture, and received the 2008 Luciano Bonaparte, Principe di Canino Prize for a book in a language other than Italian from the town of Canino for Clisson et Eugénie.

== Editorial activity ==
Hicks is a member of the editorial board for the Fondation Napoléon's e-periodical, Napoleonica La Revue, and the historical committee for publication of the complete correspondence of Napoleon I, Editions Fayard/Fondation Napoléon, Napoléon Bonaparte, Correspondance générale, vols. 1-7.

== Music ==
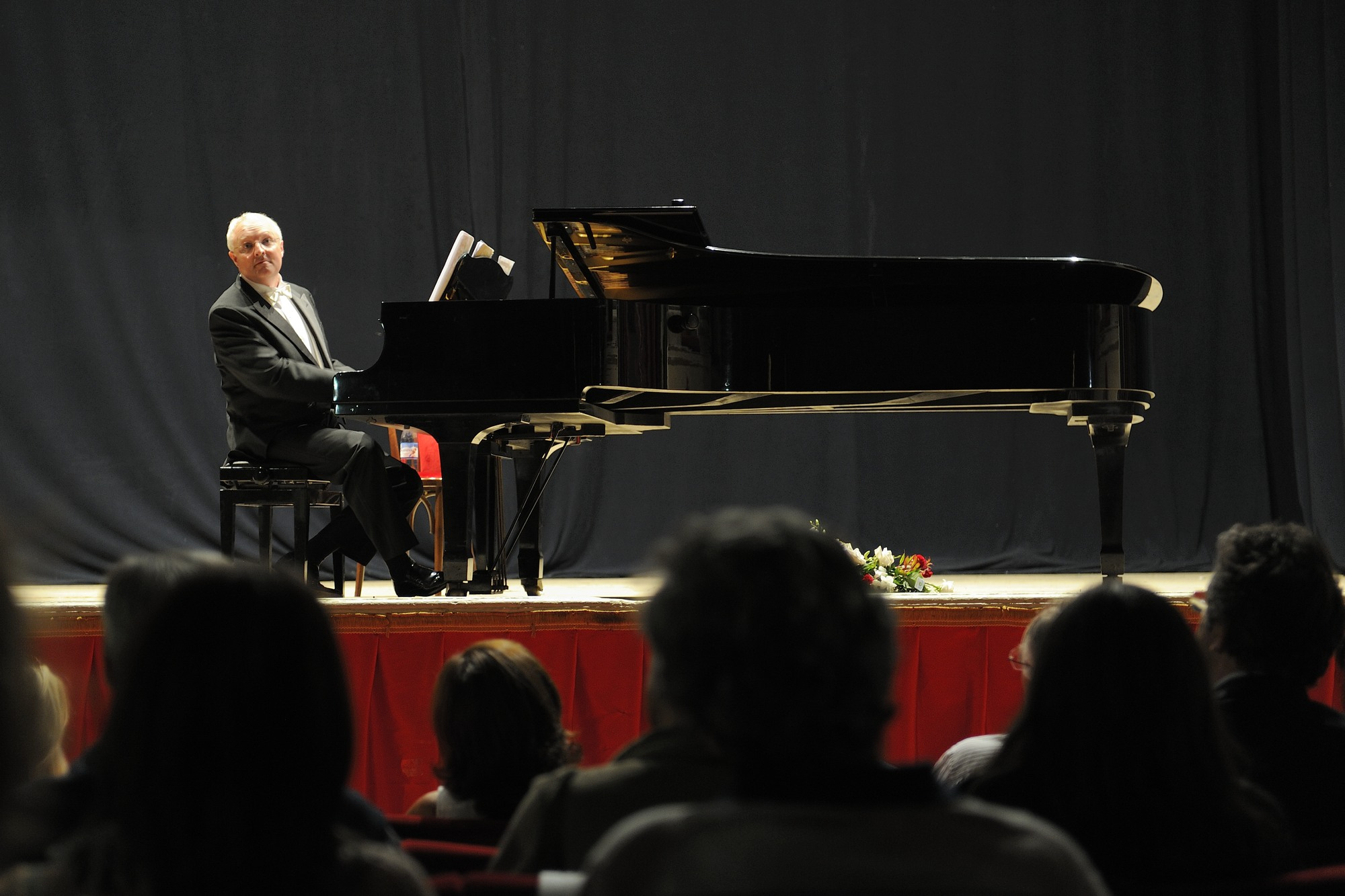
Hicks playing in Sarzana

Hicks has been the music director at St George’s Anglican Church in Paris and of the Musicanti choir, and he has also been an orchestral conductor. He has conducted Hector Berlioz' arrangement of "La Marseillaise", Brahms' Requiem, Britten's Cantata St Nicholas, Charpentier's Te Deum, Nisi Dominus, Cherubini, Coronation Mass for Louis XVIII, Handel's Messiah, Israel in Egypt, The Ways of Zion do Mourn, Utrecht Te Deum, Utrecht Jubilate, Lesueur's Cantata for the Marriage of Napoleon I and Marie-Louise, Marche du Sacre de Napolon I, Méhul's "Le Chant du depart", "O doux printemps" and "Comblé de bonheur" (cantatas for the marriage of Napoleon I and Marie Louise), Mozart's Credo Mass and Solemn Vespers of a Confessor, Paisiello's Coronation Mass for Napoleon I, Purcell's King Arthur and Rossini's Petite messe solennelle.

On the piano, he performed "Soirée Bonapartiste" in Lucca on 25 August 2008; in Canino in September 2008; in Sarzana in September 2009 and September 2011; in Châteauroux in November 2011; in Saint Petersburg in November 2012; in Rome in October 2013; in Longwood House and Jamestown, Saint Helena in October 2015; in Chicago in October 2016, and in Alençon (January 2017), La Roche-sur-Yon (March), the Château de Malmaison (April) and the Rueil Malmaison in Jubilé in September 2017.

== Publications ==
=== Edited books ===
- Emmanuel de Las Cases, Le Mémorial de Sainte Hélène: Le manuscript retrouvé, critical edition with presentation and commentary, with Thierry Lentz, François Houdecek and Chantal Prevot, Perrin 2017, p. 827. Supported by the Centre national du livre.
- La bataille de Waterloo : symbole de victoire, de défaite et lieu de mémoire/Battle of Waterloo : Introductions to the Lectures and After-Thoughts (in English) Brussels: Les éditions de la Belle alliance, 2015, p. 143.
- Napoléon Wellington, Destins Croisés, Shared Destinies. Catalogue of the exhibition of the same name at the Musée Wellington, Waterloo, 21 March – 31 July 2015, Waterloo: Musée Wellington, 2015, p. 176.
- Lieutenant Woodberry : Journal de guerre, 1813-1815, Edition présentée et annotée par Peter Hicks, traduit de l’anglais par Georges Hélie et Peter Hicks, Paris : Mercure de France, 2013, p. 435.
- The Napoleonic Empire and the New European Political Culture, with Michael Broers and Agustin Guimera, (eds.), London: Palgrave Macmillan, 2012, p. 332.
- El imperio napoleónico y la nueva cultura política europea, Michael Broers, Agustin Guimera, Peter Hicks (dirs.), Madrid: Centro de Estudios Politicos y Constitucionales, 2011, 352 p.
- Napoleone, le donne: protagoniste, alleate, nemiche. Atti del convegno internazionale Roma, 9-10 novembre 2006, ed. Massimo Colesanti with Giampaolo Buontempo and Peter Hicks. Rome: Edizioni di storia e letteratura, 2009, 217 p.
- Paper Palaces: the Rise of the Renaissance Architectural Treatise: A collection of essays on Vitruvius and Renaissance emulators, critics and commentators, edited and contributed by Vaughan Hart with Peter Hicks. Yale University Press, London and New Haven (1998).
- Leon Battista Alberti, acts of the Congrès International, Paris, 10–15 April 1995, edited by Francesco Furlan with Peter Hicks, et al., Nino Aragno Editore, Turin: J. Vrin, Paris, 2000.

=== As author ===
- Sansovino’s Venice (collaboration with Vaughan Hart), London and New Haven: Yale University Press, 2017. Supported by the Canadian Centre for Architecture, Montreal.
- Clisson et Eugénie, Napoléon Bonaparte, ed. Peter Hicks et Emilie Barthet, texte et commentaire établis d’après des documents inédits (critical edition and commentary on Napoleon’s novel), for Editions Fayard, Paris, 2007.
- Palladio’s Rome. Translation of Palladio’s L’Antichita di Roma and Descritione de le chiese…in la città de Roma, including as an appendix Raphael’s famous Letter to Leo X, with Vaughan Hart, for Yale University Press, London and New Haven. 2006. Supported by Graham Foundation. Nominated for the 2007 RIBA International Book Award. Selected as a 2007 AAUP University Press Book for Public and Secondary School Libraries. Published in paperback in spring 2009. Published in Japanese in November 2011 by Hakusuisha.
- Sebastiano Serlio on Architecture, volume 2: Translation, introduction and commentary on Books VI and VII of Serlio’s treatise on architecture, on his extraordinario libro and on his Book VIII on Polybius’ castrametation, by Vaughan Hart and Peter Hicks (2001), Yale University Press, London and New Haven. Supported by the Graham Foundation.
- Sebastiano Serlio on Architecture, volume 1: Translation, introduction and commentary on Books I-V of Serlio’s treatise on architecture by Vaughan Hart and Peter Hicks (1996), Yale University Press, London and New Haven, 484 pp. Supported by the Getty Grant Program.
- ——— (September 2019), "Non, Napoléon N'a Pas Dit: "Laissons La Chine Dormir, Car Quand Elle Se Réveillera, Le Monde Tremblera" (No, Napoleon Did Not Say: "Let China Sleep. Because When She Wakes Up, The World Will Tremble ")", Napoleon.org

=== Translations and transcriptions ===
- "D’Aupias, Memoire Historique, Anecdotique et Militaire de la Campagne de 1812, faitte par les Français en Pologne et en Russie (1813)" Napoleonica. La Revue 3/2009 (N° 6), pp. 2–42. Text presented by Alexander Mikaberidze and transcribed by Peter Hicks.
- Translation from the French of Napoleon Bonaparte’s Clisson and Eugenie, Gallic Books, London (2009).
- Translation from the Latin of Leon Battista Alberti’s Descriptio urbis Romae in Leonis Baptistae Alberti Descriptio Urbis Romae, ed. F. Furlan, Arizona University Press (2007).
- Translation from the Latin of Leon Battista Alberti’s Descriptio urbis Romae in Albertiana vol. 6 (2003).
- Translation from the Latin of <Enochi Ascolani epistola> Baptistae de Albertis, Romae, published in Albertiana, vol. V (2002), p. 243-248.
- Translation from the Italian of the seventeenth problem of Leon Battista Alberti’s Ludi matematici 'Ludi matematici, problem XVII', published in Albertiana, vol. IV (2001), p. 19.
