= Diana Darke =

British Arabist and cultural writer

- Born: 6 March 1956 (age 70); London, England, UK
- Occupations: Author, Middle East writer, Arabist, Broadcaster
- Website: dianadarke.com

Diana Darke (born 6 March 1956) is an author, Middle East cultural writer, and Arabist.

Drake graduated from Wadham College, Oxford, in 1977, where she studied German and Philosophy/Arabic.

== Publications ==
- Syria, Bradt Travel Guides, 2010, ISBN 978-1-841-62314-6.
- Oman, Bradt Travel Guides, 2010, ISBN 978-1-841-62332-0.
- North Cyprus, Bradt Travel Guides, 2012, ISBN 978-1-841-62372-6.
- Eastern Turkey, Bradt Travel Guides, 2014, ISBN 978-1-841-62490-7
- My House in Damascus: An Inside View of the Syrian Crisis, Haus Publishing, 2016, ISBN 978-1-908-32399-6.
- The Merchant of Syria: A History of Survival, Hurst Publishers, 2018, ISBN 978-1-84904-940-5.
- The Last Sanctuary in Aleppo (co-author), Headline Publishing, 2019, ISBN 978-1-4722-6057-4.
- Stealing from the Saracens: How Islamic Architecture shaped Europe, Hurst Publishers, 2020,
- The Ottomans: A Cultural Legacy, Thames & Hudson, 2022, ISBN 978-0-50025-266-6
- Islamesque: The Forgotten Craftsmen Who Built Europe's Medieval Monuments, Hurst, 2024, ISBN 978-1-8052-6097-4
