= Vaughan Hart =

British historian (born 1960)

Vaughan Hart is an architectural historian, and Professor Emeritus of Architecture in the Department of Architecture and Civil Engineering at the University of Bath. He was a Lecturer (1993-95), Senior Lecturer (1995-97), Reader (1997-05), Professor (2005-19) and head of department between 2008 and 2010.

== Early life and education ==
Hart was born in Ireland in 1960 and spent part of his childhood, from 1966 to 1969, in Hong Kong. His father worked there for GCHQ, as well as in Yangon (Rangoon) and Cheltenham, and his mother was a teacher. Hart studied architecture at the University of Bath and Trinity Hall, Cambridge, where he was taught by Michael Brawne, Patrick Hodgkinson, Peter Smithson, Ted Happold and Dalibor Vesely. Smithson was his final year undergraduate tutor, and he graduated from Bath with a B.Sc in 1983 and a first class B.Arch degree in 1985. Hart’s work was published in the Architects’ Journal that year, and two drawings were exhibited in the 1986 Royal Academy Summer Exhibition; he won the Bovis/AJ Students Prize. Between 1985 and 1986 he worked as an architectural assistant to Sir Colin St John Wilson on the British Library project in London, and one of his drawings of the entrance hall is now in the RIBA drawing's collection at the V&A in London. Hart then moved to Cambridge to teach in Wilson's unit and study for an M.Phil and then a doctorate, funded by the British Academy and the 1986 William Kretchmer Award for Postgraduate Research: his doctorate was on Inigo Jones and supervised by Joseph Rykwert.

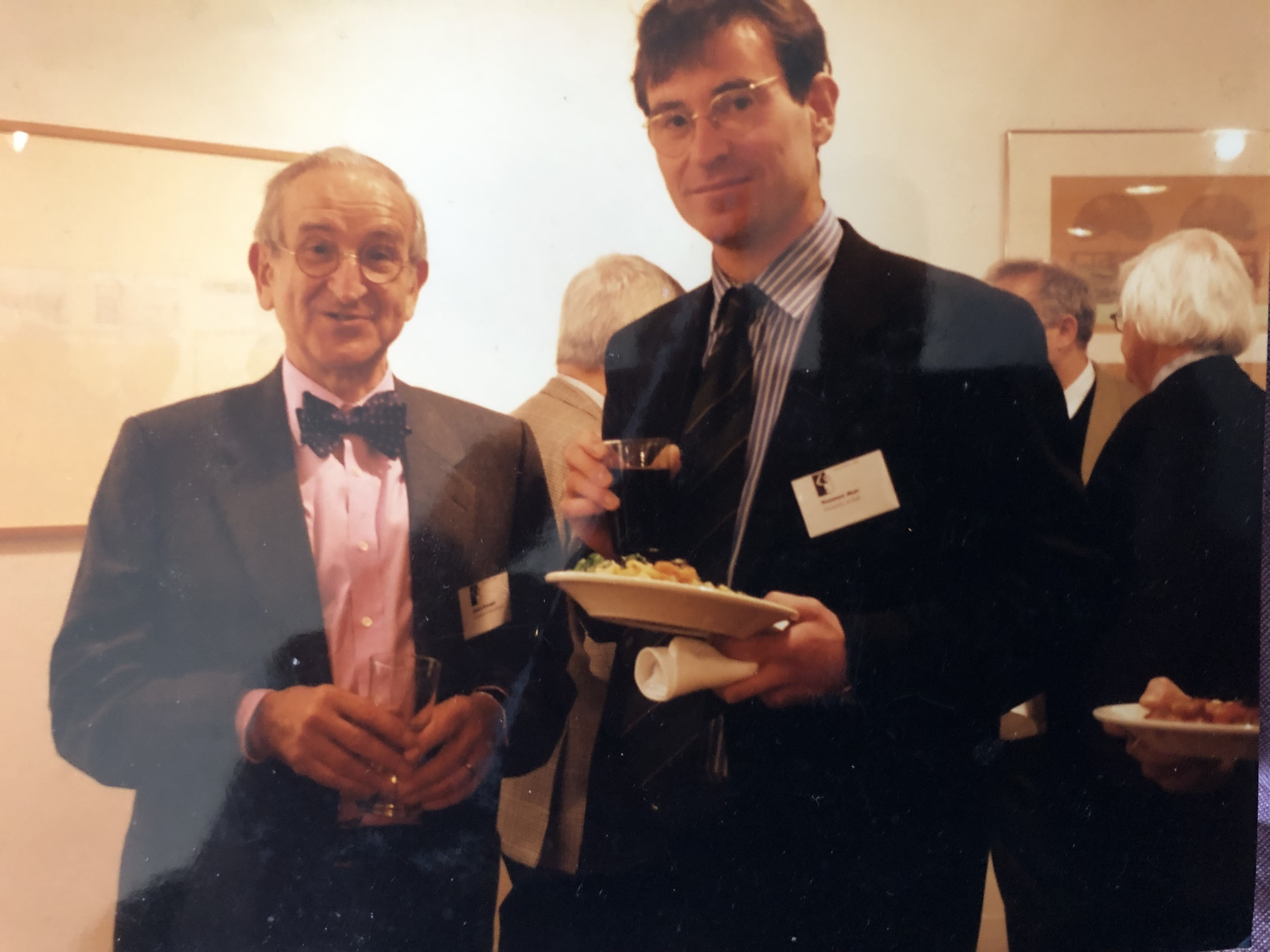
Vaughan Hart (right) with Joseph Rykwert at the University of Pennsylvania in 2002

== Publications ==
Hart's concerns lie in particular with the symbolic function of architecture, and with the sources and meaning of architectural forms. He has published widely in the field of architectural history, specialising in the Italian architectural treatises and in British architectural history of the Renaissance and Baroque periods. He is the co-translator (with Peter Hicks) of the treatises of Sebastiano Serlio, funded by the Getty Grants Programme and The Graham Foundation for Advanced Studies in the Fine Arts, and he has also co-translated the two guidebooks to Rome published by Andrea Palladio and the guidebook to Venice by Francesco Sansovino. The Palladio guide was discussed in 2006 by Jeanette Winterson in The Times and by Richard B. Woodward in The New York Times. These works were published by Yale University Press, and have themselves been translated into Chinese and Japanese. Hart's translation of these classic works stemmed from a wider project initiated by Rykwert and Robert Tavernor through their translation of the treatise by Leon Battista Alberti. Hart has simultaneously published works on British architectural history and theory. Part of his Masters thesis on Jonathan Swift’s attitude to architecture was published in History Today, and his Doctoral thesis on Inigo Jones formed the basis for his first book, on the art and architecture of the Stuart Court, published by Routledge in 1994. In 1995 Phaidon Press published Hart’s study of the rebuilding of St Paul’s Cathedral. In addition, Hart's monographs on British architects include studies of the work of Inigo Jones, Sir Christopher Wren, Sir John Vanbrugh and Nicholas Hawksmoor, all published by Yale University Press for The Paul Mellon Centre for Studies in British Art. In 2004, the latter monograph was awarded the Best Book on British Art Prize by the Historians of British Art, an affiliate society of the American College Art Association. Hart has also published essays on the buildings and architectural theorists of early Twentieth Century European Modernism. In 2023 he contributed to a London Review of Books podcast, hosted by Rosemary Hill, on the seventeenth century perception of Stonehenge.

== Exhibitions ==
In 1997 Hart was the curator of an exhibition opened by HRH the Duke of Gloucester at the Fitzwilliam Museum entitled 'Paper Palaces: Architectural books from 1472 to 1800 in the collection of Cambridge University Library'. An edited book (with Peter Hicks) on the subject of the architectural treatises was published by Yale UP a year later. In 2008 he co-organised (with Peter Hicks and Alan Day) an exhibition entitled 'Palladio's Rome' held at the British School at Rome, and in 2009 he co-organised (again with Hicks and Day) an exhibition of research work held at the Réfectoire des Cordeliers at the Sorbonne, Paris. Along with Tavernor, Hart has pioneered the use of the computer to visualise lost buildings and investigate historic forms. In 2002 he was funded by the Arts and Humanities Research Council (AHRC) to build a computer model of Hawksmoor's work in the city of Oxford. His computer work has been displayed in the 1993 and 1995 Royal Academy Summer Exhibitions, in the (now closed) National Theatre Museum at Covent Garden, the George Peabody Library at Johns Hopkins University in Baltimore in 2008, and in the ‘Nelson and Napoleon’ exhibition held at the National Maritime Museum, London, in July 2005 (the model of Napoleon’s coronation is available on YouTube).

== Teaching and fellowships ==
Hart has lectured in many schools of architecture in Europe and America, and his graduate students hold academic and museum posts in Australia, Norway and the UK. He gave the 2009 Annual Lecture at the Society of Architectural Historians of Great Britain, and in 2011 the annual Walker lecture at the British School at Rome. Hart has held visiting posts as a senior fellow of the Paul Mellon Centre for Studies in British Art in London in 2005, and as a visiting scholar at St John's College, Oxford in the same year. In 2009 he was Ailsa Mellon Bruce Visiting Senior Fellow at the National Gallery of Art in Washington, D.C. From 2013-19 he was a visiting professor at Kent University, and he served on the AHRC Peer Review College from 2011 to 2016. He was also a trustee of the Holburne Museum in Bath from 2011 to 2016, and a member of the advisory board of the Helsinki Collegium for Advanced Studies, an independent research institute within the University of Helsinki, Finland, from 2012 to 2017. He served as the assistant honorary secretary and trustee of the Oriental Ceramic Society between 2014 and 2019.

== Personal life ==
Hart is married to Charlotte Hart, a District Judge sitting in the County Court (Civil), and together they have one son.

== Publications (selection) ==
- ‘Vanbrugh’s Travels’, History Today, July 1992, vol.42, pp.26-32
- Art and Magic in the Court of the Stuarts (Routledge, 1994; eBook 2002; paperback edition 2014)
- St Paul's Cathedral: Christopher Wren (Phaidon, 1995; hardback edition 1999)
- Sebastiano Serlio on Architecture (with Peter Hicks, Yale University Press, 2 vols.: vol.1, 1996 (paperback edition 2005; Chinese edition, China Architecture and Building Press, 2014) and vol.2, 2001 (Chinese edition, China Architecture and Building Press, 2019))
- Paper Palaces: the Rise of the Renaissance Architectural Treatise (with Peter Hicks, Yale University Press, 1998)
- Nicholas Hawksmoor: Rebuilding Ancient Wonders (Yale University Press, 2002: awarded the Best Book on British Art Prize of the Historians of British Art society, The American College Art Association, in 2003; paperback edition 2007)
- Palladio's Rome (with Peter Hicks, Yale University Press, 2006; paperback edition, 2009; Japanese edition, Hakusuisha Co. Ltd., 2011: longlisted in 2007 for The Sir Nikolaus Pevsner RIBA International Book Award for Architecture)
- Sir John Vanbrugh: Storyteller in Stone (Yale University Press, 2008: shortlisted in 2008 by the Authors’ Club for the Banister Fletcher Book Prize)
- Inigo Jones: the Architect of Kings (Yale University Press, 2011: shortlisted in 2012 for the William M. B. Berger Prize for British Art History, the British Art Book Prize and Apollo Magazine's Book of the Year; shortlisted in 2013 for the Best Book on British Art by the Historians of British Art)
- Sansovino's Venice (with Peter Hicks, Yale University Press, 2017)
- 'Navel Gazing. On Albrecht Dürer's Adam and Eve (1504)', The International Journal of Arts Theory and History, 2016, vol.12.1 pp. 1–10 Hart, Vaughan Anthony (2016). "Navel Gazing : On Albrecht Dürer's Adam and Eve (1504)". The International Journal of Arts Theory and History. 12: 1–10. doi:10.18848/2326-9960/CGP/v12i01/1-10.
- Myth and Modernism: Essays on the Quest for Spiritual Architecture in the Early Twentieth Century (Kindle Direct Publishing, 2019)
- Christopher Wren: In Search of Eastern Antiquity (Yale University Press, 2020, shortlisted for the 2021 William M. B. Berger Prize for British Art History)
- ‘London's Standard: Christopher Wren and the Heraldry of the Monument’, in RES: Journal of Anthropology and Aesthetics, Autumn 2020, 73/74: pp. 325–39
- ‘“In Search of Brick Towers”: Robert Byron’s Monuments of Humanism’, in Monumentality: Geographies, Histories, Ideologies, ed. E.A. Kassler-Taub and I. Riar (Getty Publications, forthcoming 2027), pp. 226-39
- Photographs of Hawksmoor's buildings taken by Hart are held in the Conway Library of art and architecture, The Courtauld.
