= Old Charges =

14th-18th century Freemasonry documents

The Old Charges is the name given to a collection of approximately 130 documents written between the 14th and 18th centuries that relate to the history of Freemasonry. Most of these documents were initially in manuscript form and later engraved or printed, all originating from England. These documents describe the duties and functioning of masons' and builders' guilds, as well as the mythical history of the craft's creation. It is within these fundamental texts, particularly the Regius poem (1390), also known as the Halliwell manuscript, and the Cooke manuscript (1410) for England, as well as the Schaw Statutes (1598) and the Edinburgh manuscript (1696) for Scotland, that speculative Freemasonry draws its sources. However, from a historical perspective, it does not claim a direct lineage with the operative lodges of that era.

== History ==
Studied and rediscovered since the mid-19th century, these approximately 130 texts are grouped under the generic term of Old Charges, or Old Charges. Most of them are manuscripts, and some versions were engraved or printed, spanning from the late 14th century to the mid-18th century. They are all of English origin, with no equivalent on the continent. The structure of the manuscripts is identical, presenting a legendary history of the craft's creation, praise for the seven traditional liberal arts, and an enumeration of the ethical and regulatory duties of the masons involved in construction.

=== 14th century ===
The oldest known manuscript document that traces the usages and traditions of English operative masonry is the Regius poem, dated around 1390. This document consists of three parts written in verse, totaling 794 lines. The first part narrates the traditional history of the craft and the Duties of the operative masons. The second part details these Duties in fifteen articles and fifteen points, with the third part primarily of a moral nature. These Old Charges from the Middle Ages are associated with the operative lodges and provide insights into the customs and practices of construction sites during that era.

Following the Regius, the Cooke manuscript appeared around 1420. It exhibits differences from its predecessor. Written in prose and spanning 960 lines, it elaborates on the rules of the Regius by incorporating elements from the Bible and patristic traditions. It reduces the Duties to nine articles and nine points while introducing new elements such as an invocation to God, an ode to geometry, and an exposition on the Liberal Arts. Many subsequent versions of the Old Charges are derived from this manuscript, as the Regius did not have any other descendants.

Both manuscripts share a similar structure. After a historical and mythical account of the craft's creation, they emphasize the obligation to take an oath. This is followed by a set of rules called "articles" and "points", fifteen for the Regius and nine for the Cooke. These rules address professional matters and also include Christian moral prescriptions. These documents make no reference to any authority of the craft or any form of subordination, giving the impression that the operative lodges governed by these rules operated autonomously during the periods, sometimes spanning decades, of construction projects. These two manuscripts, the Regius and the Cooke, are the only sources dating from the late 14th century, and no other versions of these Old Charges are known to date.

=== 16th century ===
It took 150 years to see the emergence of a new manuscript version dated 1583, known as Grand Lodge No. 1. Nearly 130 known versions to date are derived from this new version. This first document of the 16th century, as well as those that follow, do not reproduce the entire original texts and diverge significantly on various points. This evolution categorizes these documents as a second generation of Old Charges. In these manuscripts, the operative regulations, the main content of the 14th century, are omitted or simplified to allow for application to forms beyond just operative masonry. Precepts and provisions of a moral and religious nature are also introduced in this generation of documents.

== Reception ceremony ==
A reception ceremony for a new member into the corporation of freemasons in England, following the customs of the Middle Ages, was practiced within the corporations. In his work, author Patrick Négrier calls it the "Rite of the Old Charges", though this name or the existence of such a rite is not attested by historical documents. The Old Charges manuscripts describe this ceremony as an oath-taking, preceded by a reading of the Duties, the legendary history of the craft, and an exhortation, which can be likened to an early ritual.

== See also ==
- Freemasonry
