= SOM Foundation =

American architectural and engineering firm

- Company type: Non-profit organization
- Founded: 1979
- Website: www.somfoundation.com

The SOM Foundation, established in 1979, is an organization dedicated to advancing the capabilities of the design profession in addressing contemporary societal challenges. The foundation's grant programming was established in 1981 and currently offers five annual awards across the United States, Europe, and China. The grants support students and faculty of architecture, landscape architecture, urban design, interior design, and engineering to undertake rigorous interdisciplinary research that can help shape our future.

As of 2021, the SOM Foundation has awarded more than $2.7 million to over 281 fellows who have gone on to distinguish themselves in professional and academic careers.

Some notable SOM Foundation award recipients include Marion Weiss (1982), Werner Sobek (1983), Douglas Garofalo (1987), Santiago Calatrava (1988), Joshua Ramus (1995), Ole Scheeren (2000), Catie Newell (2006), Brandon Clifford (2011), Biayna Bogosian and Kristine Mun (2018), [10] and Clare Lyster (2019).

== Awards ==
The SOM Foundation currently offers five awards:

- Research Prize
- European Research Prize
- Structural Engineering Fellowship
- China Fellowship
- Robert L. Wesley Award

=== Research Prize ===
In 2018, the SOM Foundation introduced the Research Prize—an evolution of the former SOM Prize and SOM Travel Fellowship programs—to cultivate new ideas and meaningful research that addresses the critical issues of our time. Each year, two $40,000 prizes are awarded to faculty-led interdisciplinary teams based in the United States to conduct original research that contributes to the SOM Foundation’s current topic.

=== European Research Prize ===
In 2021, the SOM Foundation introduced the European Research Prize as an expansion of the US-based Research Prize to cultivate new ideas and meaningful research that addresses the critical issues of our time. The European Research Prize builds on the legacy of the UK Award that was established in 1996. Each year, one €20,000 prize is awarded to a faculty-led interdisciplinary team based in Europe to conduct original research that contributes to the SOM Foundation’s current topic.

=== Structural Engineering Fellowship ===
In 1998, the SOM Foundation created the Structural Engineering Traveling Fellowship, since renamed the Structural Engineering Fellowship, to support research that has the potential to influence the practice and teaching of how structures can positively impact our built environment. The $20,000 fellowship is awarded annually to a graduating student based in the United States who specializes in structural engineering to conduct independent travel and research that contributes to the SOM Foundation’s current topic.

=== China Fellowship ===
In 2006, the SOM Foundation established the China Prize, now the China Fellowship, to support emerging design leaders to broaden their education and contribute to their future professional and academic careers. The $5,000 China Fellowship is awarded annually to three students in the last two years of either an undergraduate or graduate program in architecture, landscape architecture, interior architecture, and urban design in the People’s Republic of China to conduct independent travel outside China and research that contributes to the SOM Foundation’s current topic.

=== Robert L. Wesley Award ===
In 2020, the SOM Foundation created the Robert L. Wesley Award—named in honor of the first Black partner at SOM—to support BIPOC undergraduate students enrolled in architecture, landscape architecture, interior architecture, urban design, or engineering programs in the United States. Each year, three students will receive a $10,000 award in addition to a yearlong mentorship program that connects the students with leading BIPOC practitioners and educators. The awards are unrestricted in their use to best support the needs of students.

As part of the Robert L. Wesley Award, the SOM Foundation established a mentorship program to support the recipients of the annual award. The program is structured around a series of sessions led by a network of leading practitioners and educators. Mentors include Paola Aguirre, Germane Barnes, Danei Cesario, Leo Chow, Chris Cornelius, Iker Gil, Roberto Gonzalez, Jia Yi Gu, Joyce Hwang, Ojay Obinani, Quilian Riano, Maria Villalobos Hernandez, Robert L. Wesley, and Amanda Williams.

== Topics ==
Each year, the SOM Foundation defines a topic to cultivate new ideas and meaningful research that addresses the critical issues of our time. The first topic, “Humanizing High Density,” was introduced in 2018 to complement the newly defined Research Prize, an evolution of the former SOM Prize and Travel Fellowship programs. Subsequent topics include “Shrinking Our Agricultural Footprint,” “Examining Social Justice in Urban Contexts,” and "Envisioning Responsible Relationships with Materiality.” Today, the topics unite the interdisciplinary work carried out for the Research Prize, European Research Prize, Structural Engineering Fellowship, and China Fellowship. An international jury of academics and practitioners, chosen for their expertise on the topic, is assembled for each award to select the recipients and contribute to the overall conversation.

== Public programming ==
Throughout its history, the SOM Foundation has organized or sponsored multiple lectures and panel discussions. Notable architects, engineers, artists, and researchers who have lectured as part of SOM Foundation events include Aaron Betsky, Philippe Block, Jennifer Bloomer, James Carpenter, Beatriz Colomina, Janet Echelman, Benjamin Gianni, Douglas Graf, K. Michael Hays, Catherine Ingraham, Jeffrey Kipnis, Mark Linder, Robert McAnulty, Mark Rakatansky, Robert Segrest, Charles Waldheim, John Whiteman, and Mark Wigley.

== Leadership ==
The SOM Foundation is led by the Executive Director along with the appointed Officers and Directors, who represent all current SOM Partners.

- Iker Gil – Executive Director
- Leo Chow – Cochair
- Scott Duncan – Cochair
- Laura Ettelman – Treasurer
- Kent Jackson – Secretary
- Vram Malek – Assistant Treasurer

== Juries ==
Since 1981, every award has been evaluated by a prestigious set of jurors that include SOM Partners and invited outside members. Some of the past industry professionals who participated in juries for the SOM Foundation awards include: Henry N. Cobb, Chris Cornelius, Jeanne Gang, Justin Garrett Moore, Frank Gehry, Toni L. Griffin, Charles Gwathmey, Hugh Hardy, Thom Mayne, Charles Willard Moore, Marina Otero Verzier, Cesar Pelli, Mónica Ponce de León, Charles Renfro, Leslie Robertson, Zoë Ryan, Martha Schwartz, Allan Temko, Stanley Tigerman, Billie Tsien, Sumayya Vally, Massimo Vignelli, Amanda Williams, and Tod Williams.

== Chicago Institute for Architecture and Urbanism ==
In 1986, the SOM Foundation purchased and restored the Charnley House (1891–1892) for its offices. The historic building, located on the north side of Chicago’s Gold Coast, was designed by Louis Sullivan with assistance from his junior draftsman, Frank Lloyd Wright. The same year, coinciding with the fiftieth anniversary of SOM’s founding, the Foundation announced its intention to create an institute devoted to architectural research. Leon Krier was appointed to a three-year term in August 1986, however, he abruptly resigned in January 1987. A new search was started and John Whiteman, then at Harvard University, was appointed as the director.

During Whiteman’s term the Institute brought in a number of established and emerging scholars to pursue projects. Fellows included Ann Bergren, Jennifer Bloomer, Alan Colquhoun, Elizabeth Diller, Mario Gandelsonas, Benjamin Gianni, K. Michael Hays, John Hejduk, Catherine Ingraham, Jeffrey Kipnis, Ben Nicholson, Mark Rakatansky, Saskia Sassen, and Richard Sennett.

British architectural critic and editor Janet Abrams succeeded John Whiteman and was the second director of the Institute between 1991 and her resignation in 1992. During Abrams’s term, the CIAU developed its public programming and served a wider audience. Speakers during that time included Eva Jiricna, Mike Davis, Jean-Louis Cohen, Wes Jones, John Hejduk, Andrea Kahn, and Keller Easterling.

The Chicago Institute for Architecture and Urbanism closed down in July 1994 and the Charnley House was sold in April 1995.

== See also ==
- Skidmore, Owings & Merrill
