= ANY (magazine) =

American architectural journal

ANY (an acronym for "Architecture New York") was an architectural journal published by the ANYone Corporation for over seven years. The first issue was published in May 1993, and the last in September 2000. A total of 27 issues were published.

Contributors to ANY included Zaha Hadid, Bernard Tschumi, Elizabeth Diller, Rem Koolhaas, Sanford Kwinter, R.E. Somol, Peter Eisenman, and Greg Lynn. Issues one to eight were designed by long-time Eisenman collaborator, Massimo Vignelli. Beginning with number eight, the magazine was designed by graphic design firm, 2x4 (Georgianna Stout and Michael Rock).

ANY was succeeded by Log, also published by the ANYone Corporation.
