= Assemblage (journal) =

- Discipline: Architecture; Architectural History
- Language: English
- Edited by: K. Michael Hays; Alicia Kennedy

Publication details
- History: 1986–2000
- Publisher: MIT Press (United States)
- Frequency: Triannual

Standard abbreviations
- ISO 4: Assemblage

Indexing
- ISSN: 0889-3012
- JSTOR: 08893012

Assemblage was an architectural theory journal published by MIT Press from 1986 to 2000.

== History ==
K. Michael Hays and Alicia Kennedy served as the main editors for all 41 issues. The original consulting editors were Mary McLeod, Mark Rakatansky, and Ellen Shapiro. Other editors included Catherine Ingraham, Stan Allen, Sarah Whiting, Mark Pasnik and Monica Ponce de Leon.

== Contributors ==
The journal's advisory and editorial board included many architectural theorists and writers, including Stanford Anderson (vol. 1–14), Francoise Choay (vol. 1–5), Mario Gandelsonas (all volumes), Jorge Silvetti (all volumes), Werner Oechslin (vol. 1–16), Beatriz Colomina (vol. 14–41), Mark Rakatansky (vol. 14–33), Mark Wigley (vol. 14–41), Sanford Kwinter (vol. 16–41), Robert McAnulty (vol. 17–41), Jennifer Bloomer (vol. 17–41), and Lauren Kogod (vol 33–41).
