= Kwinter =

Surname list

Kwinter is a surname. Notable people with the surname include:

- Monte Kwinter (1931–2023), Canadian provincial politician
- Sanford Kwinter, Canadian architectural theorist
