= Nader Tehrani =

American architect

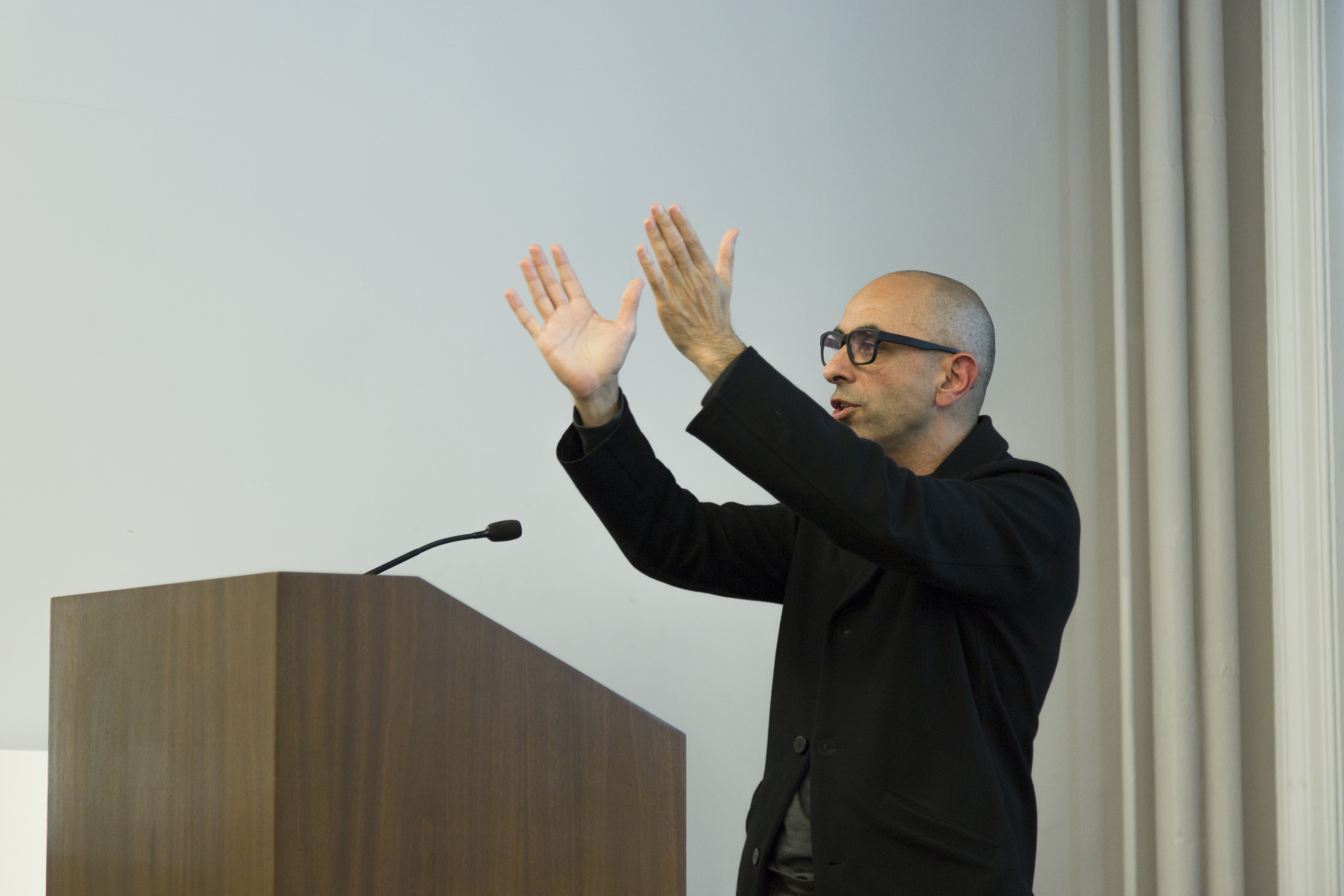
- Born: 1963 (age 62–63); London
- Education: Harvard Graduate School of Design, Rhode Island School of Design
- Occupation: Architect
- Practice: NADAAA (2011) Previously Office dA (1986)
- Buildings: Melbourne School of Design, Daniels Building, Daniels Building, Hinman Building, Macallen Building, Helios House, Fleet Library, Raemian Gallery, North Hall
- Website: http://www.nadaaa.com/

Nader Tehrani (born 1963 in London) is an Iranian-American designer and educator.

In 2011 in partnership with Katherine Faulkner, Tehrani founded NADAAA, a practice dedicated to the advancement of design innovation, interdisciplinary collaboration, and an intensive dialogue with the construction industry. The two were later joined by partner Arthur Chang. Tehrani is the former Dean of the Cooper Union's Irwin S. Chanin School of Architecture. Previously he was a professor of architecture at the MIT School of Architecture and Planning, where he served as head of the department from 2010 to 2014, MIT. He previously founded Office dA in 1986 with Rodolphe el-Khoury, later being joined by Mónica Ponce de León in 1991.

Tehrani has taught at the MIT School of Architecture and Planning, Harvard Graduate School of Design, Rhode Island School of Design, Georgia Institute of Technology where he served as the Thomas W. Ventulett III Distinguished Chair in Architectural Design, and University of Toronto as the Frank O. Gehry International Visiting Chair at the John H. Daniels Faculty of Architecture, Landscape and Design. Tehrani was the 2017/2018 William A. Bernoudy Architect in Residence at the American Academy in Rome. Tehrani is the 2019 Inaugural Paul Helmle Fellow at the California State Polytechnic University.

Tehrani is the recipient of the 2020 American Academy of Arts and Letters Arnold W. Brunner Memorial Prize.

== Early life and education ==
He was raised in Pakistan, South Africa, Iran, and the United States.

Tehrani received a B.F.A. and a B. Arch from the Rhode Island School of Design in 1985 and 1986 respectively. He continued his studies at the Architectural Association School of Architecture, where he attended the Post-Graduate program in History and Theory and in the European Honors program in Rome. Upon his return to United States, Tehrani received an M.A.U.D from the Harvard Graduate School of Design in 1991.

== Work ==
- Adams Street Branch Library, Boston, MA (2020)
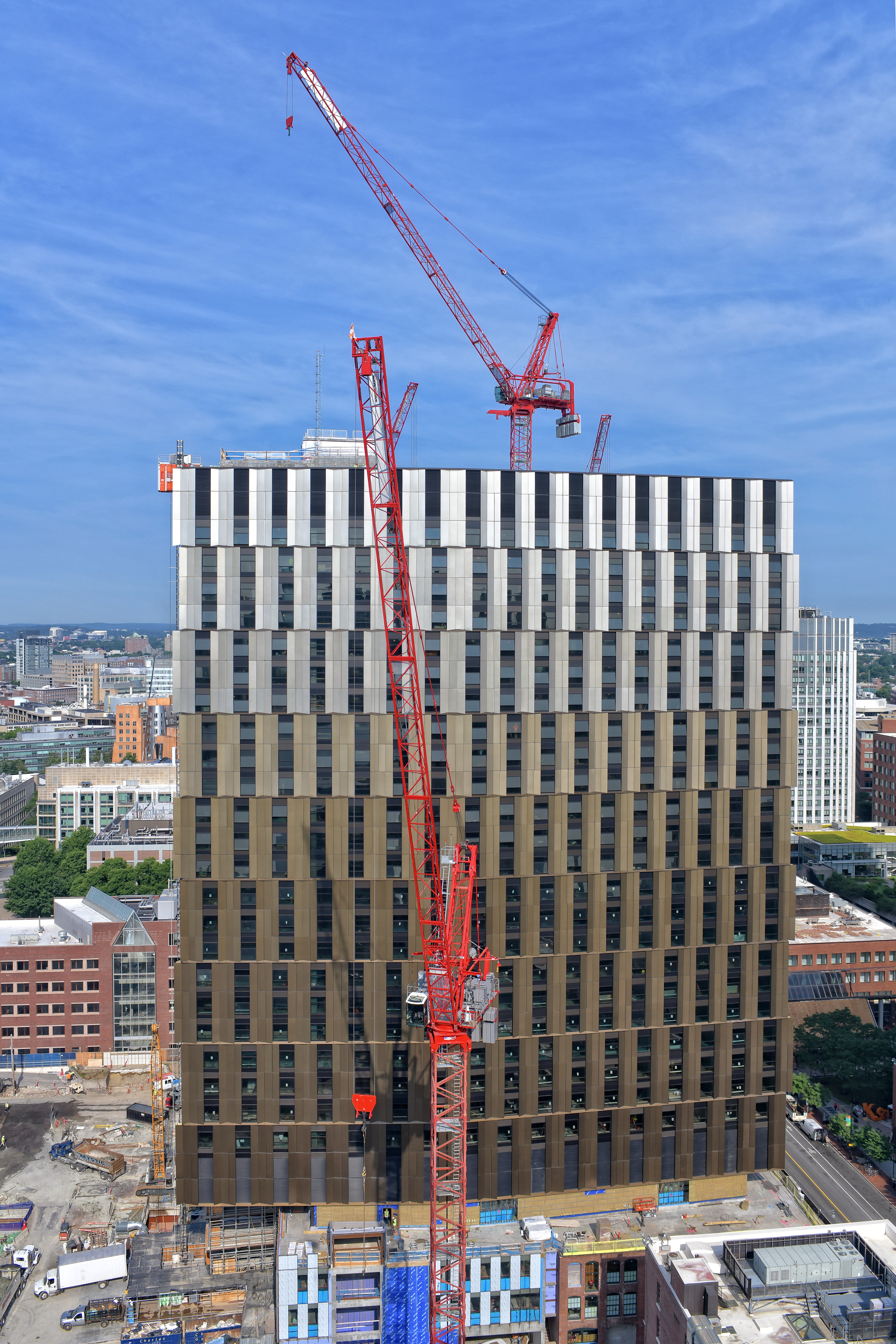
- MIT Site 4
  MIT Site 4, Boston, MA (2020)
- Villa Varoise, South of France (2019)
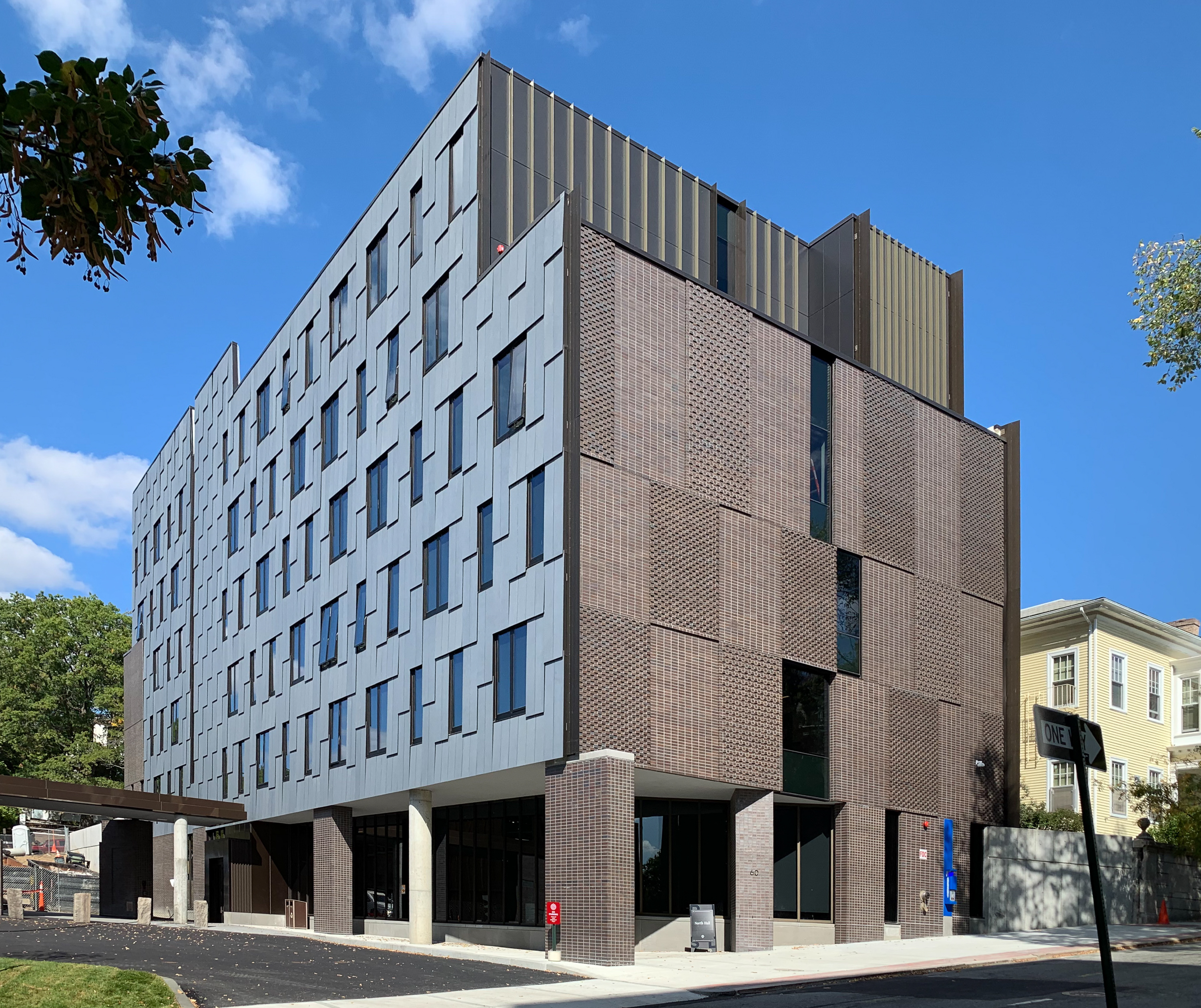
- RISD North Hall, Providence, Rhode Island (2019)
  North Hall, Rhode Island School of Design, Providence, RI (2019)
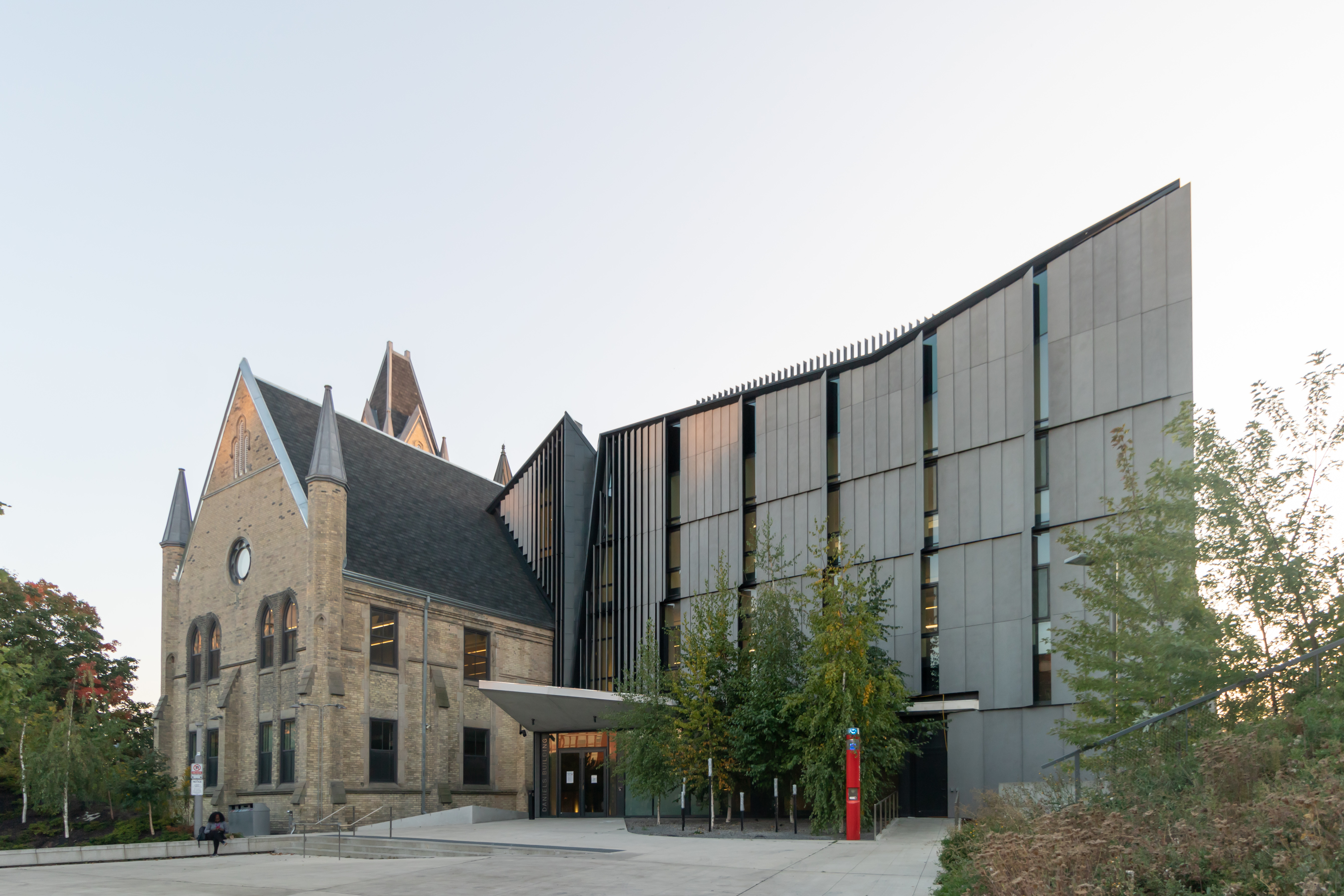
- University of Toronto, John H. Daniels Faculty of Architecture, Landscape and Design, Toronto, Canada (2018)
  University of Toronto, John H. Daniels Faculty of Architecture, Landscape and Design, Toronto, Canada (2018)
- Beaver Country Day School, Boston, MA (2017)
- Rock Creek House, Washington DC (2016)
- Tanderrum Bridge, Melbourne, Australia (2016)
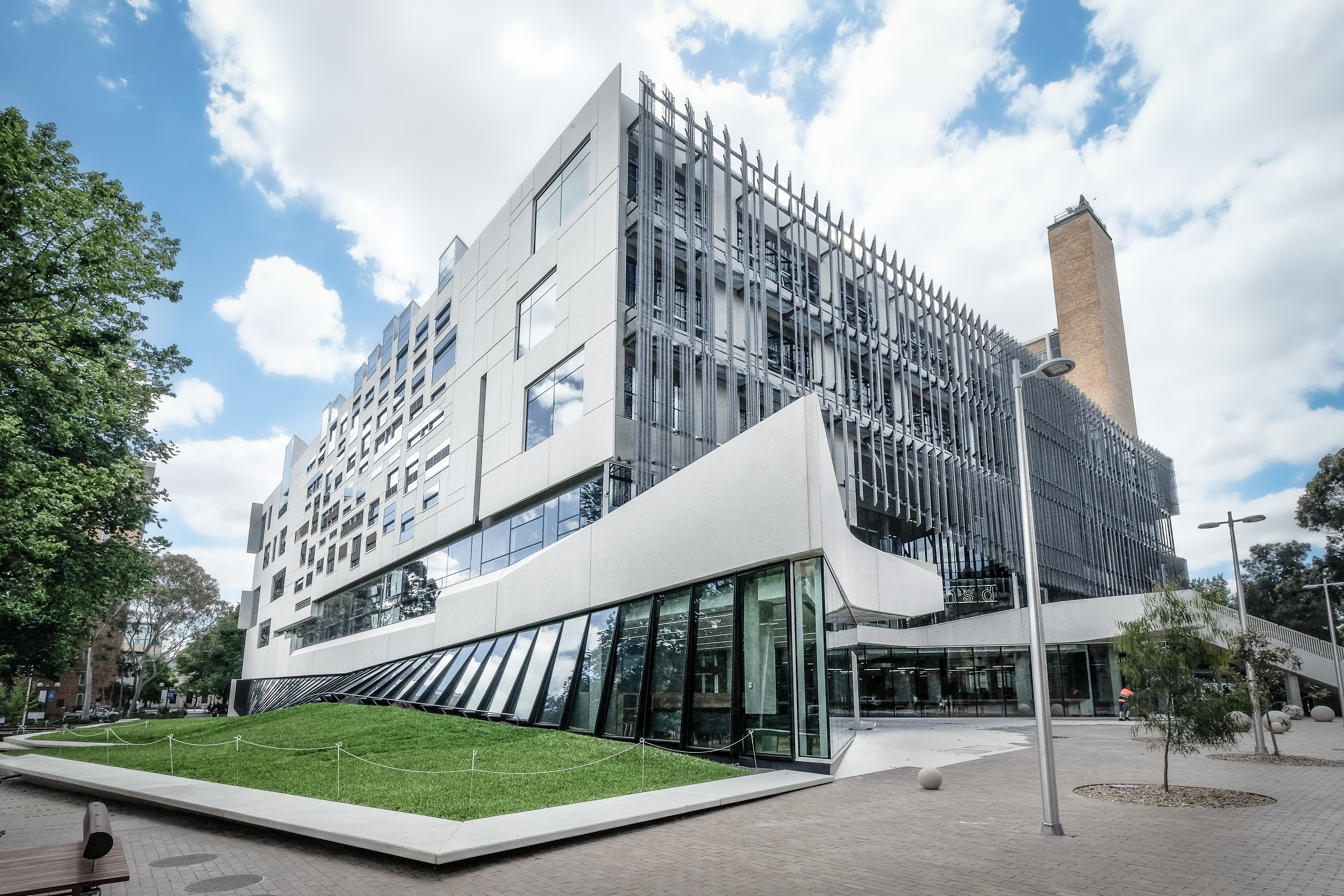
- Melbourne School of Design, Melbourne, Australia (2014)
  University of Melbourne, Melbourne School of Design, Melbourne, Australia (2014)
- Aesop Stores: Hong Kong, Soho New York, San Francisco (2013)
- Raemian Model Home Gallery, Seoul, South Korea (2012)
- Newton House, Newton, MA (2011)
- Hinman Research Building, Georgia Institute of Technology, Atlanta, GA (2011)
- Banq, Boston, MA (2008)
- Macallen Building, Boston, MA (2007)
- Helios House, Los Angeles (2007)
- Fleet Library, Rhode Island School of Design, Providence, RI (2006)
- House in New England, Massachusetts (2003)
- Tongxian Gatehouse, Beijing, China (2003)
- Upper Crust, Charles Street, Boston, MA (2001)
- Mantra, Boston, MA (2001)
- Back Bay Residence, Boston, MA (2001)
- Harvard Graduate School of Design Offices, Harvard University, Cambridge, MA (2000)
- Inter-faith Spiritual Center, Northeastern University, Boston, MA(1998)

== Recognition ==
Nader Tehrani was selected as the recipient of the 2020 Arnold W. Brunner Memorial Prize, an award which is given "to an architect of any nationality who has made a significant contribution to architecture as an art." Tehrani's work has been recognized with notable awards, including eighteen Progressive Architecture Awards, four 2018 American Architecture Awards, four 2017 Chicago Athenaeum Awards, a 2019 AIA Cote Top Ten Award, a finalist for the 2017 Moriyama RAIC International Prize, and a nominee for the 2017 Marcus Prize for Architecture. Other honors include: a 2014 Holcim Foundation Sustainability Award, the 2012 Boston Society of Architects Hobson Award, the 2007 Cooper-Hewitt National Design Award in Architecture, the 2007 United States Artists, USA Target Fellows AD award, the 2002 American Academy of Arts and Letters Architecture Award, and the 2002 Harleston Parker Medal. Over the past seven years, NADAAA has consistently ranked as a top design firm in Architect Magazine's Top 50 U.S. Firms List, ranking as First three of those years.

=== Exhibitions ===
Tehrani's research and installations have been exhibited in venues such as the Museum of Modern Art in New York, the Institute of Contemporary Art, Boston and at the Museum of Contemporary Art, Los Angeles. His work is also part of the permanent collection of the Nasher Sculpture Center in Dallas and the Canadian Centre for Architecture in Montreal.

=== Lectures ===
Tehrani has lectured widely at institutions including the Solomon R. Guggenheim Museum in New York, Harvard University, Princeton University and the Architectural Association School of Architecture. Tehrani has participated in many symposia including the Monterey Design Conference (2009), the Buell Center "Contemporary Architecture and its Consequences" at Columbia University (2009), and the Graduate School of Design "Beyond the Harvard Box" (2006).

=== Articles ===
He has authored several articles, including "Aggregation" and "Difficult Synthesis" in Material Design: Informing Architecture through Materiality by Thomas Schroepfer. He also authored "Versioning: Connubial Reciprocities of Surface and Space" in Architectural Design. He wrote the introduction to The Work of Machado & Silvetti, 2018. He wrote the foreword to Victor Lundy: Artist Architect, 2017. He wrote the preface to Patkau Architects, 2017. His 'Tectonic Grain' lecture was published in Manifesto, 2017. He wrote "The Timeless Anachronism of Type" for Obra Architects Logic, 2016 and "Control, Realized" for The Architecture of WOJR. He contributed 'The Architectural Grain' to This Building Likes Me, 2016. In 2016 for The Plan he wrote "A Disaggregated Manifesto: Thoughts on the Architectural Medium and its Realm of Instrumentality". His work has also been internationally reviewed and published in periodicals such as Architect, Architectural Record, Icon, Wallpaper, Monitor, The Plan, Abitare, Mark, Frame, I.D., Contract, Archiworld, the Boston Globe, the Wall Street Journal, and the New York Times, among others.

== Publications ==
- Rodolphe el-Khoury and Oscar Riera Ojeda. Office dA. Gloucester, Massachusetts: Rockport Publishers, 2000.
- Elizabeth Bennett de Stefani. Office dA: Mónica Ponce de León and Nader Tehrani. Santiago, Chile: ARQ ediciones, 2005.
- Greg Lynn (ed.). Office dA: Mónica Ponce de León, Nader Tehrani and Greg Lynn discuss Witte Arts Center. Montreal: Canadian Centre for Architecture, 2017.
