= Michael Rock =

Michael Rock is the name of:

- Michael Rock (DJ), American DJ at radio station WFHN
- Michael Rock (graphic designer), American graphic designer
- Michael Rock (swimmer) (born 1987), British swimmer

== See also ==
- Michael Rocque
