= College of Architecture and Urban Planning =

College of Architecture and Urban Planning may refer to

- College of Built Environments, previously College of Architecture and Urban Planning from 1957 to 2009, at the University of Washington
- Taubman College of Architecture and Urban Planning, at the University of Michigan
