= Bahram Shirdel =

Iranian architect (born 1951)

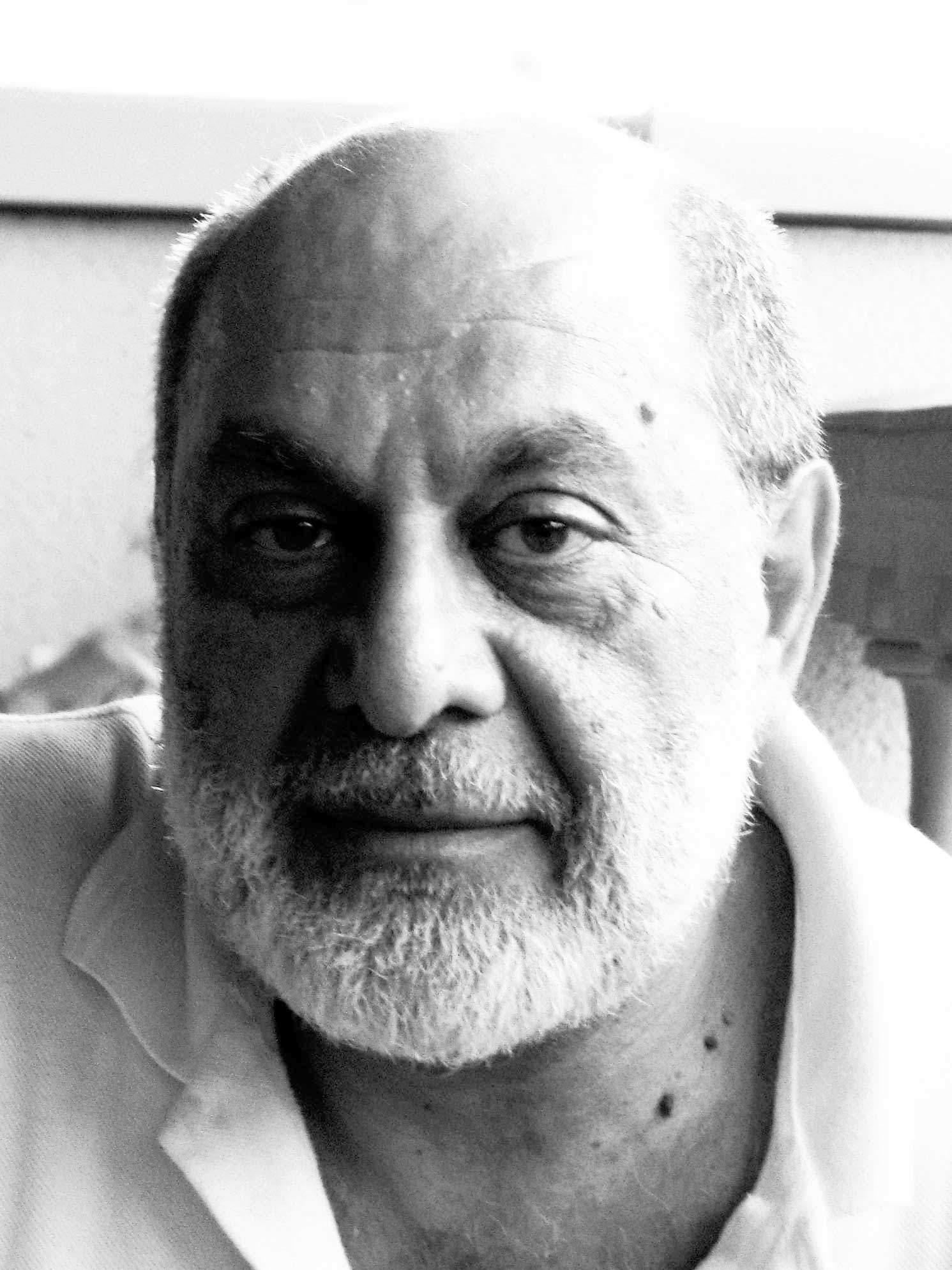
- Bahram Shirdel
- Born: June 22, 1951 (age 75); Tehran, Iran
- Occupation: Architect

Bahram Shirdel is an Iranian architect internationally known as one of the most influential architects dealing with the interdisciplinary field of architecture and science as well as Fold/Folding Architecture. Jeffrey Kipnis, Greg Lynn, Peter Eisenman and Bahram Shirdel are among the architect-theoricians who accept topology as a cultural and scientific resource of folded, curved, undulated and twisted architectures. They are concerned with the dynamic aspects of topological geometry - that is, with the more general processes of continuous transformation.

Professor Bahram Shirdel has been the director of Graduate Design program at the Architectural Association School of Architecture in London (where he also co-lectured with his working partner Jeff Kipnis), and co-supervised diploma projects with Peter Eisenman at the Graduate School of Design at Harvard University. He has also taught design and theory at the University of Houston, Texas; Georgia Institute of Technology, University Chicago, University of Miami, Ohio State University, Southern California Institute of Architecture and American University of Sharjah, U.A.E. Bahram Shirdel was a recipient of Christopher Wren Medal from Canada and CGA Gold Medal city planning from China. His work has been widely exhibited worldwide; Venice Biennale of Architecture 1984 and the Museum of Modern Art, New York, in 1992. Shirdel and Partners office was established in Tehran in 1997, after practicing in London as Shirdel and Kipnis Architects and practicing as Aks-Runo in Los Angeles. During these years this practice designed projects in the U.S., Canada, Japan, China, Brazil, etc.; where the firm applied its design techniques, research and theory to the spatial organization of large scale and complex projects.
