= David Weeks =

David Weeks may refer to:

- David Weeks (politician) (1946–2021), British politician, Leader of Westminster City Council
- David Weeks (designer) (born 1968), American designer
- David F. Weeks (1874–1929), American football player, coach, and doctor
- J. David Weeks (born 1953), member of the South Carolina House of Representatives
