= Log (magazine) =

American architectural magazine

- Editor: Cynthia Davidson
- Frequency: Triannual
- Publisher: Anyone Corporation
- Founded: 2003
- Based in: New York
- Language: English
- Website: https://www.anycorp.com/
- ISSN: 1547-4690

Log is an independent magazine on architecture and the contemporary city that has been published by the Anyone Corporation since 2003 and is edited by Cynthia Davidson. The tagline for the magazine is "Observations on Architecture and the Contemporary City." The magazine is published three times a year, with general "open" issues punctuated by occasional thematic issues. It contains essays and articles by architectural and urban theorists and historians, curators, architects, and artists, including Pier Vittorio Aureli, Christophe Van Gerrewey, Mario Carpo, Patrik Schumacher, Preston Scott Cohen, K. Michael Hays, Sylvia Lavin, Paola Antonelli, Greg Lynn, Antoine Picon, François Roche, Anthony Vidler, Paul B. Preciado, Paul Virilio, Peter Eisenman, Reinhold Martin, Phyllis Lambert, Jeff Kipnis, Alejandro Zaera-Polo, Robert Somol, Daniel Sherer, and Hubert Damisch.

== See also ==
- ANY (magazine)
