= Jeffrey Kipnis =

American architectural critic

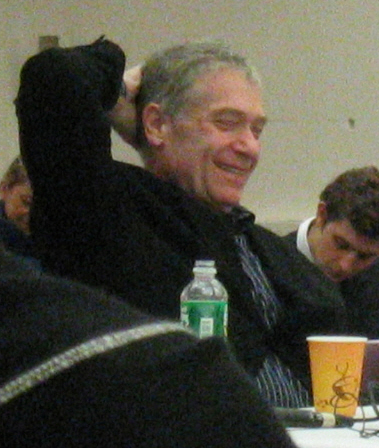
- Jeffrey Kipnis in November 2006
- Born: 1951 (age 74–75); Georgia, United States
- Known for: Art history, Architectural history, Architectural theory

Jeffrey Kipnis (born 1951, Georgia) is an American architectural critic, theorist, designer, film-maker, curator, and educator.

== Education, honors, and career ==
Although neither educated nor trained as an architect, Kipnis first came to prominence in architectural circles through his association with architects Bahram Shirdel and Peter Eisenman (and their joint collaboration with French philosopher Jacques Derrida). Kipnis received a master's degree in physics from Georgia State University in 1981. In 1989, he co-taught his first graduate studio in architecture with Catherine Ingraham at the University of Illinois at Chicago. He soon joined the faculty of the Knowlton School of Ohio State University, where he was a professor of architecture until retiring in 2022.

In 2006, Kipnis was awarded an honorary diploma by the Architectural Association School of Architecture, London, in recognition of his contributions to the discipline of architecture as a teacher, critic, and theorist. Other honors include the AIA (Georgia Chapter) Bronze Medal for Service to Architecture (1985), a Professional Development Award from the Architectural Society of Ohio Foundation (1992), and an Ohio State University Distinguished Research Award (2005).

Kipnis has been a visiting professor at Princeton University, Columbia University, the Southern California Institute of Architecture, the Harvard University Graduate School of Design, and a guest professor of Urban Strategies at the Institute of Architecture, University of Applied Arts Vienna. He taught at the Architectural Association from 1992 to 1995, where he was the founding director of the Graduate Design Program. He also curated Architecture and Design exhibitions at the Wexner Center for the Arts in Columbus, Ohio.

As a critic and theorist, Kipnis's work has been published in numerous journals, including Assemblage, El Croquis, Architectural Design, Harvard Design Magazine, Log, and Quaderns.

=== Designer ===
During the 1990s Kipnis collaborated with the Iranian architect Bahram Shirdel on the design of influential projects such as the Scottish National Museum, Montreal Urban Design 1990-2000, and Place Jacques Cartier. Kipnis also collaborated with architects Reiser + Umemoto (RUR Architects) on the Kansai-kan National Diet Library and the Water Garden in Columbus, Ohio, which won a 1998 Progressive Architecture Design Award.

== Select bibliography ==
- Kipnis, Jeffrey. "Against Two Gravities," in Get Off of My Cloud: The Texts of Coop Himmelblau 1968-2005, Hatje Cantz, 2005.
- Kipnis, Jeffrey. "What we need here is -- failure to communicate!!" Quaderns 245 (April 2005): 94-100.
- Kipnis, Jeffrey. "Some Thoughts on Contemporary Paintings in the Hope that Analogies to Architecture Might be Drawn." Hunch 9, Rotterdam, 2005.
- Kipnis, Jeffey. "The Cunning of Cosmetics." Herzog & de Meuron: El Croquis 84, Madrid, Spain, 1997.
- Kipnis, Jeffrey and Philip Johnson, "A Conversation around the Avant-Garde" in Robert Somol (ed), Autonomy and Ideology: Positioning an Avant-garde in America, New York, Monacelli Press, 1997.
- Kipnis, Jeffrey and Thomas Leeser (ed), Chora L Works: Jacques Derrida and Peter Eisenman, New York, Monacelli Press, 1997.
- Kipnis, Jeffey. "Toward a New Architecture." AD: Folding and Pliancy, Academy Editions, London, 1993.
- Kipnis, Jeffrey. "Twisting the Separatrix," in K. Michael Hays (ed), Architectural Theory Since 1968, Cambridge, MIT Press, 1998. [originally published in Assemblage 14, 1992).
- Kipnis, Jeffrey. In The Manor of Nietzsche, Calluna Farms Press, New York, 1990.
- Kipnis, Jeffey. "Architecture: The Sacred and the Suspect." Journal of Architectural Education, ACSA, Washington DC, 1987.
- Kipnis, Jeffey. "Drawing a Conclusion." Perspecta 22, MIT Press, Cambridge, Mass., 1986.
