= Taubman College of Architecture and Urban Planning =

Architecture and urban planning college at the University of Michigan

Coordinates: 42°16′58″N 83°44′5″W

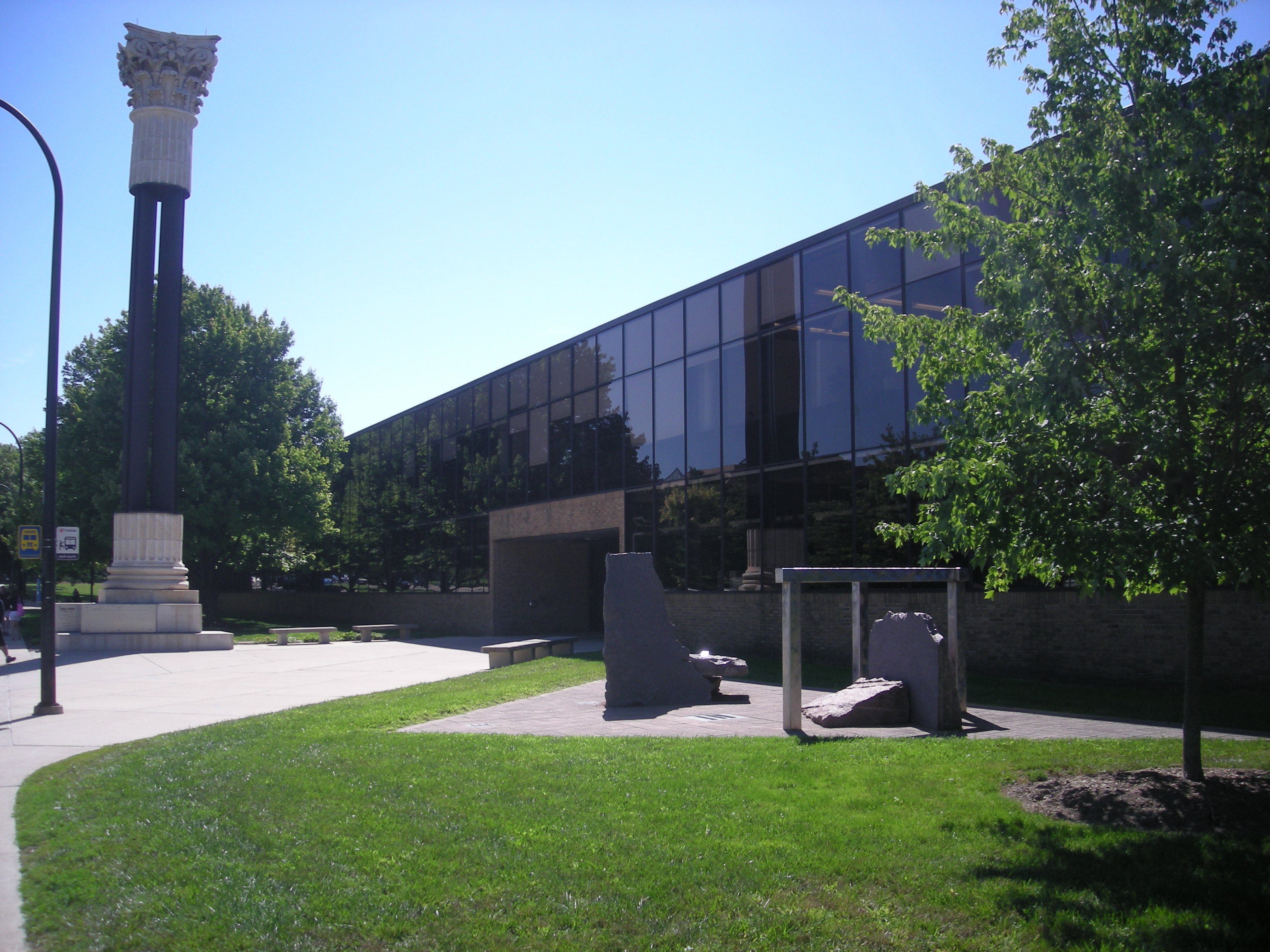
- Former names: College of Architecture (1931–1939); College of Architecture and Design (1939–1974); College of Architecture and Urban Planning (1974–1999)
- Type: Public
- Established: 1906; 120 years ago
- Parent institution: University of Michigan
- Accreditation: NAAB, PAB
- Location: Ann Arbor, Michigan, United States
- Campus: Suburban
- Website: taubmancollege.umich.edu

The A. Alfred Taubman College of Architecture and Urban Planning (abbreviated as Taubman College) is the college of architecture and urban planning of the University of Michigan, located in Ann Arbor, Michigan.

The college offers the following degrees: Bachelor of Science in Architecture, Bachelor of Science in Urban Technology, Master of Architecture, Master of Science in Architecture: Advanced Design and Construction, Master of Urban and Regional Planning, Master of Urban Design, and PhD programs in Architecture and Urban and Regional Planning.

Originally a degree program established in 1906 within the Department of Engineering, it became the College of Architecture in 1931 and renamed the College of Architecture and Design in 1939. In 1974, the college was separated into the College of Architecture and Urban Planning and the School of Art and Design. The former was renamed after A. Alfred Taubman for his US$30 million donation to the college in May 1999. The gift was one of the largest in the history of the University of Michigan and the largest ever to a school of architecture.

== History ==
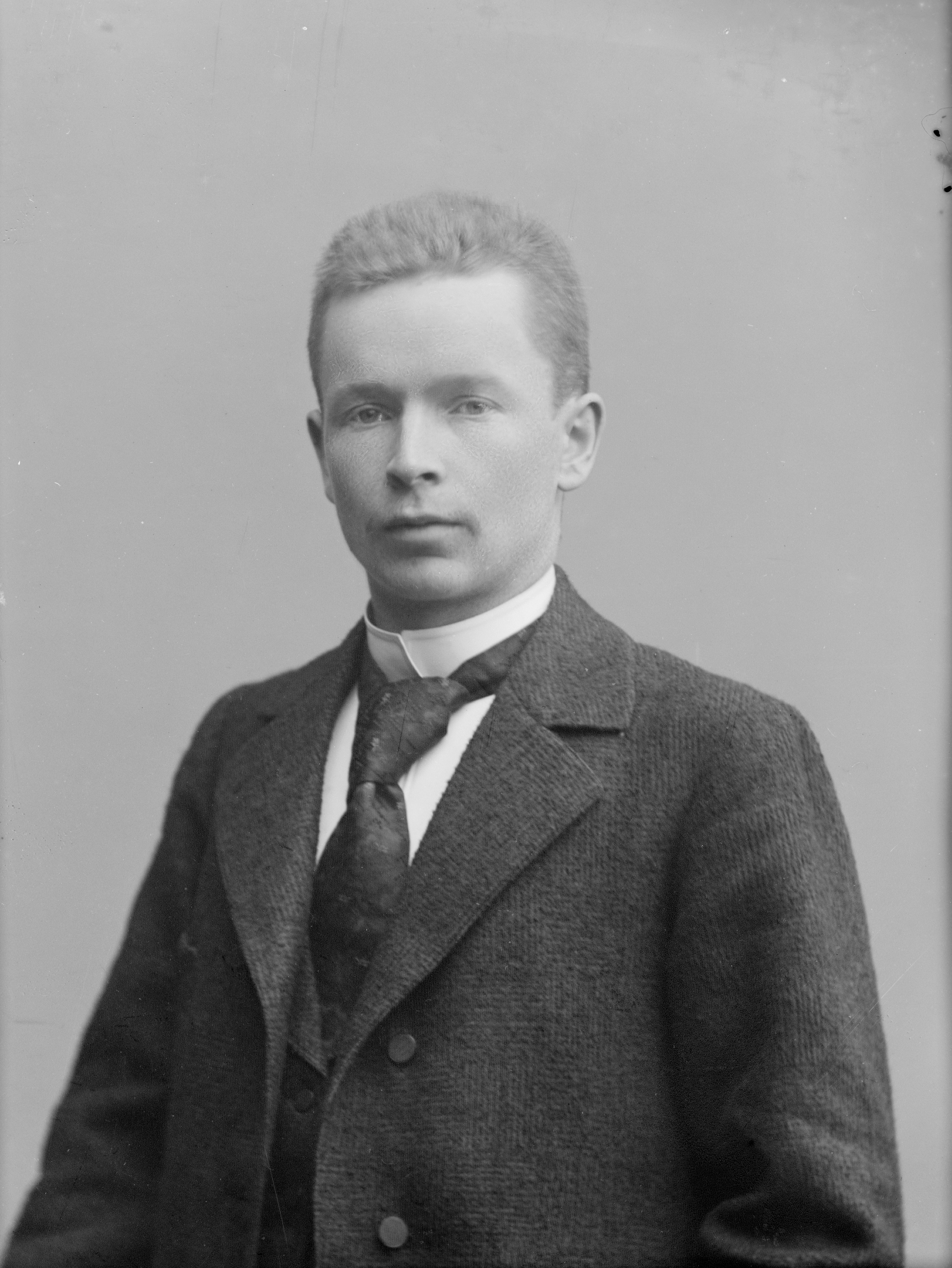
Eliel Saarinen, the architect behind the campus of Cranbrook, joined the architecture faculty in 1923. He taught Henry Booth, the son of Cranbrook's founder George Gough Booth, at the architecture school.

In 1876, the University of Michigan became one of the first universities in the United States to offer courses in architecture, led by influential Chicago architect William Le Baron Jenney. After thirty years, a degree program within the Department of Engineering was established in 1906, under the direction of Emil Lorch, who served to administer the program and its ever-evolving iterations until 1937. Housed in what is now Lorch Hall on Central Campus, the program quickly grew into the Department of Architecture by 1913. In 1923, world-renowned architect Eliel Saarinen joined the faculty of the department, with which he was associated during his design, construction, and subsequent presidency of the Cranbrook Academy of Art.

By 1931, the College of Architecture had been established with 370 students and 27 faculty members. In 1932, Donald F. White became the first Black graduate from the department. The department grew to become the College of Architecture and Design in 1939, introducing Landscape Architecture and, by 1948, one of the first Master of City Planning degrees. The 1940s also saw the college taking a progressive role with regards to architectural research, establishing the Architecture Research Laboratory that would pioneer the integration of design, construction, technology, planning and research. In 1965, the Landscape Architecture program moved to the university's School of Natural Resources.

In 1968, the college made history by establishing the first-ever doctoral program in architecture, fueled by a strong level of academic inquiry into the field. In 1974, many positive changes took place in the college, including the separation of programs into the College of Architecture and Urban Planning and the School of Art and Design. During this same year, the programs outgrew their home on Central Campus and found a new home on North Campus, the Art and Architecture Building, in which both schools remain to this day.

In 1999, the college was renamed the A. Alfred College of Architecture and Urban Planning after A. Alfred Taubman donated $30 million to the college. This was one of the largest gifts in the history of the University of Michigan and the largest ever to a school of architecture at the time.

== Rankings ==
=== Architecture ===
Taubman College's graduate and undergraduate programs in architecture are consistently among the most highly ranked. In its 2009 edition of "America's Best Architecture & Design Schools", the Design Futures Council journal DesignIntelligence ranked the Master of Architecture program 9th in the nation. For 2011, the program rose to 1st, overtaking the Harvard Graduate School of Design, which had held the spot since DI began ranking M.Arch programs individually in 2004. In this survey, Taubman College's M.Arch program was also rated the 5th most admired by school deans, and fared well in the following skills areas:

- 1st - Analysis and planning
- 2nd - Communication
- 3rd - Computer applications
- 3rd - Construction methods and materials
- 3rd - Design
- 2nd - Research and theory
- 2nd - Sustainable design practices and principles

The school's dramatic rise was attributed to recent administrative and curriculum changes that have focused on upending a centuries-old pedagogical model still taught at most schools. Changes have included making ancillary coursework more integral to design studio curriculum, and fostering hands-on research and development as permeating the discipline at all levels, from analysis, to design, to communication.

=== Urban planning and design ===
The urban and regional planning program was ranked 9th in the nation in Planetizen's 2019 Guide to Graduate Urban Planning Programs. The urban design program was recognized by New Urban News as the 4th best program in the nation for new urbanism.

== Facilities ==
Taubman College is located on the University of Michigan's North Campus in the Art & Architecture Building (A&AB). This building houses the largest academic studio in the world, at 30,000 continuous square feet, for roughly 450 undergraduate and graduate architecture students and graduate urban design students.

On September 8, 2017, Taubman College opened the new A. Alfred Taubman Wing which provides an additional 36,000 square feet to the original 72,000 square foot facility, and the project includes a renovation of the existing college facilities. Architecture and urban planning education increasingly calls on spaces for group work and spaces to design and build. The wing and renovations provide additional studio space per student and collaboration rooms, as well as 5,700 square foot commons space which will also be used to host conferences, final reviews, and other special events. Designed by Preston Scott Cohen, Inc. (Design Architect) with Integrated Design Solutions (IDS) (Architect of Record), the building addition's internal architecture features a series of spiral-like stairs and ramps that create sequences choreographed to encourage encounters between faculty and students. Externally, a saw-tooth roof reflects warm light, unifying the orthogonal geometry of the studio with the hexagonal and ramped commons. A plaza underneath the new building provides and outside gathering and exhibition space to foster community. The building addition and renovation project was funded by private donations from the late A. Alfred Taubman and King C. Stutzman, additional funds from the U-M Offices of the President, Provost, and Chief Financial Officer, and the support of alumni and friends. The total budget for the entire project (addition and renovation of existing facilities) is $28.5 million.

In fall 2009, the Taubman College completed a renovation of its Digital Fabrication Laboratory, or FABLab. The two-story space houses 7,000 sq ft (650 m^{2}). of computer-controlled fabrication equipment. The list of machines includes a 30’x10’x8’ 7 axis robotic work cell, two additional robotic work cells, two 4’x8’ CNC routers, a 4’x8’ abrasive water jet cutting machine, a Zund knife cutter, and a CNC milling machine. These machines give students and faculty the capability to digitally fabricate using any material at full scale. In addition the FABLab operates three rapid prototyping machines, and four laser cutters. A fully outfitted woodworking and welding shop complements the FABLab. http://taubmancollege.umich.edu/fablab/

North Campus is also home to the College of Engineering, the School of Computer Science, the School of Music, Theatre & Dance, and the Penny W. Stamps School of Art & Design. Other pertinent facilities on North Campus include the Art, Architecture & Engineering Library (AAEL), the Digital Media Commons, the Bentley Historical Library, the Gerald R. Ford Presidential Library and Maya Lin's Wave Field.

== Fellowships and visiting professorships ==
Taubman College offers a variety of faculty fellowships and visiting professorships.

Current fellowships include the Architecture Fellowships in three areas of interest: Research, Design, and Project, as well as the Fishman Fellowship, the Sojourner Truth Planning Fellowship, and the Norman E. Barnett Fellowship in Environmental Technology.

The visiting professorships are endowed in the name of Eliel Saarinen, Charles Moore, Max Fisher, and Colin Clipson, and have attracted the following notable individuals:

- Eliel Saarinen Visiting Professors: Lawrence Scarpa (2007), Aaron Betsky (2006), Michael Sorkin (2006), Yung Ho Chang (2004), Tod Williams and Billie Tsien (2002)
- Max Fisher Visiting Professors: Robert Somol (2007), Lawrence Scarpa (2005), Steven Kieran and James Timberlake (2004), Brian Mackay-Lyons (2003)
- Charles Moore Visiting Professors: J. Max Bond Jr. (2003)
- Colin Clipson Visiting Professors: Michael Benedikt (2003), N. John Habraken (2002)
- Sustainability Visiting Professors: Alan Berger (2005), Steve Badanes (2003)

== Deans ==
Since the mid-20th century, the college has been headed by Deans:

- Philip N. Youtz (1957–1964)
- Reginald F. Malcolmson (1964–1974)
- Robert C. Metcalf (1974–1986)
- Robert M. Beckley (1987–1997)
- James C. Snyder (interim 1997–1998)
- Douglas S. Kelbaugh (1998–2008)
- Monica Ponce de Leon (2008–2015)
- Robert Fishman (interim 2015-2017)
- Jonathan Massey (2017-current)

== People ==
=== Notable alumni ===
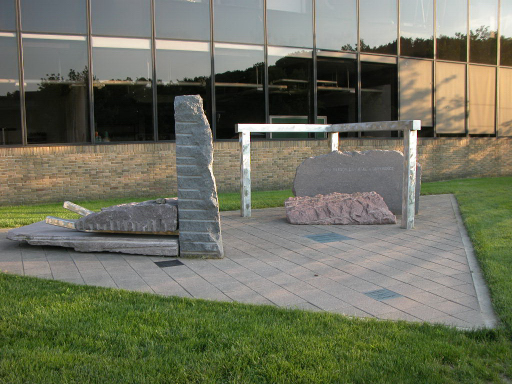
Köszönöm, a monument at Taubman College in honor of alumnus Raoul Wallenberg.

- Charles Correa (B.Arch. 1953; Hon. D.Arch, 1980) - influential Indian architect and activist, recipient of the Praemium Imperiale and the RIBA Royal Gold Medal.
- John Dinkeloo (B.S. 1942) - engineer, partner with Eero Saarinen and Pritzker Prize laureate Kevin Roche, worked alongside Gunnar Birkerts while he was at Saarinen's office
- Dan Dworsky (B.Arch. 1950) - former UM linebacker and architect of the University's Crisler Arena.
- Douglas Farr (B.S. 1980) - Chicago-based sustainable architect, urban planner, and author of Sustainable Urbanism (2007).
- Dr. Ed Jackson Jr. (D.Arch. 1993) - Executive Architect for the Martin Luther King Jr. Memorial in Washington, DC.
- Marcy Kaptur (M.U.P 1974) - the Democratic U.S. Representative for Ohio's 9th congressional district, since 1983.
- Charles Willard Moore (B.Arch, 1947; Hon. D.Arch, 1992) - postmodernist, educator, former dean of the Yale School of Architecture, and AIA Gold Medal recipient.
- Robert Nickle (B.A. 1943) - artist, studied architecture and design.
- Jorge M. Perez (M.U.P. 1976) - Miami-based developer.
- Marshall Purnell (B.S. 1972; M.Arch 1973) - first African-American president of the American Institute of Architects.
- Ralph Rapson (B.S. 1938) - modernist architect, protégé of Eliel Saarinen, and Dean of the University of Minnesota School of Architecture from 1954 to 1984.
- John Ronan (B.S. 1985) - Architect of Poetry Foundation Headquarters in Chicago, IL
- Howard Sims (B.S.1963, M.Arch. 1966) - Architect of Charles H. Wright Museum of African American History in Detroit, MI.
- A. Alfred Taubman (early 1940s, did not graduate) - real-estate developer, philanthropist, and college namesake.
- Tom Tjaarda (B. Arch 1958) - Automobile Designer
- Sim Van der Ryn (B. Arch 1958) - sustainable architect and long-time faculty member at the UC Berkeley College of Environmental Design.
- Raoul Wallenberg (B.Arch. 1935) - Swedish diplomat and humanitarian who worked in Budapest, Hungary, during World War II to rescue Jews from the Holocaust.
- Donald F. White (B.Arch 1932, M.S. 1934), noted architect and engineer, first Black graduate of the department.

=== Notable current and former faculty ===
- Eliel Saarinen (1923–1950)
- Gunnar Birkerts (1959–1990)
- Yung Ho Chang (1988–89, 2004)
- William LeBaron Jenney (1876–1879)
- Monica Ponce de Leon (2008–2015)
- Malcolm McCullough (2001–present)
