= Georgianna Stout =

American graphic designer

- Born: Georgianna Stout; 1967 (age 58–59)
- Education: Rhode Island School of Design
- Known for: Graphic design
- Spouse: David Weeks
- Awards: National Design Award

Georgianna Stout (born 1967) is an American graphic designer.

== Biography ==
Stout graduated with a B.F.A. in graphic design from the Rhode Island School of Design in 1989. From 1990 to 1993, Stout worked at Bethany Johns Design, a firm that specializes in print and publication for museums, art institutions, publishers and individual artists. 1994 she founded 2x4 with partners Michael Rock and Susan Sellers. There she designed brand identity, retail and environmental programs for such institutions as the Brooklyn Museum of Art, the Nasher Sculpture Centre, the Studio Museum in Harlem, and Dia:Beacon. Stout also headed packaging and retail projects for the Vitra New York and Vitra Los Angeles headquarters, and worked on network branding for MTV. For Knoll Textiles, she was partner-in-charge for a product launch. She has been a visiting design critic at RISD and at the Yale University School of Art.

Stout also collaborates with her husband, designer David Weeks, in his design studio, David Weeks Studio.

== 2x4 ==
Stout is a founding partner and creative director of 2x4 where she leads a wide range of projects including extensive retail and packaging design initiatives, large-scale identity, exhibition and environmental graphics as well as way finding programs. 2x4 is a New York City-based design studio founded in 1994 with satellite studios in Beijing. The studio works in a cultural sector developing brand strategy and design systems for clients worldwide.

As lead creative director of 2x4 she has had the opportunity to work with Knoll, Maharam, Blick and Flavor Paper to developing textiles and wall coverings.

== Accomplishments ==
Stout, together with 2x4, was the 2006 recipient of the Cooper-Hewitt National Design Award in Communication design. 2x4 have been recognized by many professional organizations and publications, including the American Institute of Graphic Artists, Graphis, Print, Communication Arts, and the American Center for Design.

== Exhibitions ==
- 9 + 1 Ways of Being Political: 50 Years of Political Stances in Architecture and Urban Design, September 12, 2012–June 9, 2013

Installation from the MoMA’s collection showing how different architects have responded to the conditions of the polis.

- Just In: Recent Acquisitions from the Collection, December 21, 2007–October 27, 2008

The installation shows the latest innovations by those in the Department of Architecture and Design made in the past two years.

- Nike 100 Debuting at the 2008 Beijing Olympics

This exhibition described the history of the Nike brand through 100 quintessential artifacts that embody the unrelenting pursuit of lightness and speed.
