= Brian Collins (designer) =

American graphic designer

- Collins in 2026
- Education: Massachusetts College of Art and Design
- Occupation: Designer • creative director • educator
- Awards: Distinguished Alumnus Award (Massachusetts College of Art and Design) (2004); American Design Master (Fast Company) (2005); Honorary degree (ArtCenter College of Design) (2008); Claude Shannon Luminary Award (Bell Labs) (2018)
- Website: www.wearecollins.com

Brian Collins (born 1959 or 1960) is an American designer, creative director, and educator. He is the chief creative officer of Collins, an independent strategy and brand experience design company. Previously, he served as chairman and chief creative officer of the brand and innovation division of Ogilvy & Mather for ten years.

== Early life and education ==
Brian Collins was born in 1959 or 1960) grew up in Lexington, Massachusetts, and graduated with a BFA from the Massachusetts College of Art and Design in 1982. He also studied at Parsons School of Design in New York City.

== Career ==
Collins is a designer, creative director, and educator.

After graduating college, Collins started his own studio in his parents' garage, working with clients including the Digital Equipment Corporation, John Hancock Financial, and Perkins School for the Blind. The company grew to a team of 20 and relocated to Concord, Massachusetts.

Collins's interest in working on global brands led him to sell the business, and he spent a summer in London before being hired by The Duffy Design Group in Minneapolis, whose clients included Giorgio Armani, Jim Beam Brands, and Porsche.

In 1995, Collins moved to FCB in San Francisco to work on Levi Strauss & Co., Amazon, MTV, and The Walt Disney Company.

=== Ogilvy & Mather ===
In 1998, he became senior partner and chief creative officer for the new design and brand identity division at Ogilvy & Mather in New York. At Ogilvy, he worked for clients including The Hershey Company, Kodak, IBM, The Coca-Cola Company, BP, Motorola, Mattel, Vera Wang, American Express, Kraft Foods, Unilever, and New York City's bid for the Olympic Games, NYC2012.

When Hershey's hired Collins and his team, they initially requested a billboard design in Times Square, but Collins expanded the project into a retail store in New York City's Times Square that has remained open for over 15 years.

In 2004, Collins's team launched the Dove Campaign for Real Beauty in North America. The campaign won the Media Image Award from the National Organization for Women.

In 2007, Collins's team collaborated with Office dA in the design of BP's Helios House gas station in Los Angeles. The project is included in Cooper Hewitt, Smithsonian Design Museum. The project also won the I.D Magazine Annual Design Review Award for Environments, Design Distinction; AIA Los Angeles Design Award; and the 2009 Grand Clio Award for Design.

In July 2013, Collins was appointed to the Ogilvy & Mather Worldwide Creative Council, the council that oversees the agency's work globally.

=== Other projects ===
After the September 11 attacks, Collins and his team published the book Brotherhood, which became the basis of an exhibit at the Museum of the City of New York. It was a tribute to New York City's firefighters that reached The New York Times Best Seller list.

Collins also produced The Ecology of Design, a handbook on environmental design thinking, published in 1996 by the American Institute of Graphic Arts.

== Collins ==
In 2008, Collins founded Collins (stylized as COLLINS:), a strategy and brand experience design company. The company's first job was working with The Martin Agency to design an ad campaign on global warming for the Alliance for Climate Protection.

The company designed the CNN Grill, and led the brand and design development for the new Microsoft stores in partnership with The Martin Agency and Gensler.

The company's 2015 global redesign and identity system for Spotify was cited as one of the year's most notable designs by Fast Company, Wired, and Design Week.

== Honors and awards ==
- Distinguished Alumnus Award, Massachusetts College of Art and Design (2004)
- American Design Master, Fast Company (2005)
- Image Award, National Organization for Women (2006) - won for work on Dove's Campaign for Real Beauty
- Honorary degree, ArtCenter College of Design (2008)
- Gold Pencil, The One Club (2009)
- Grand Clio, Clio Awards (2009)
- Honored as one of the year's best designs, AIGA (2011) - for work on the Microsoft Store
- Graphis Master, Graphis Journal (2018)
- Claude Shannon Luminary Award, (Bell Labs) (2018)

== Selected works ==
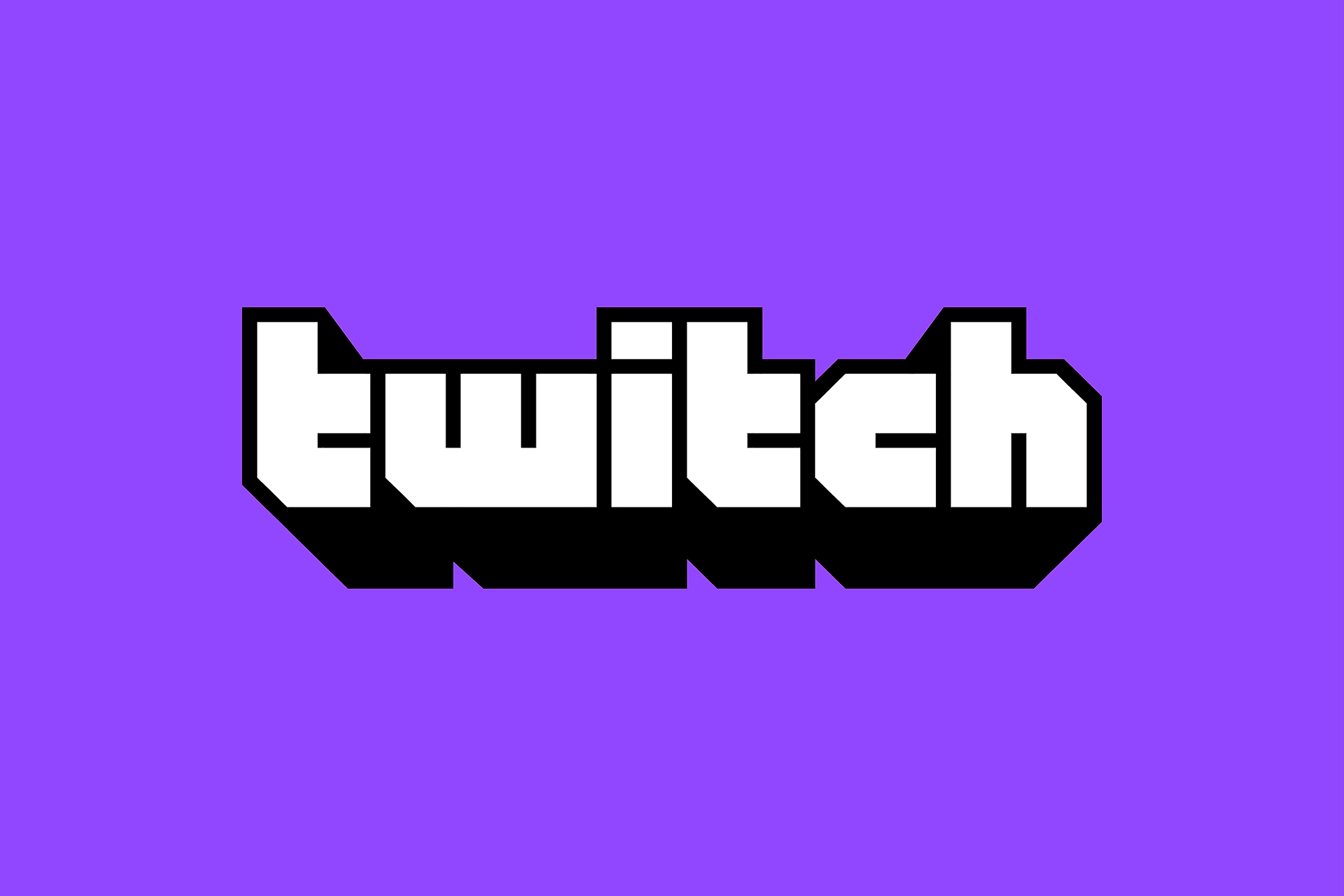
Twitch logo and brand identity

Spotify brand identity

BP Helios House / Los Angeles

Olympic Games campaign / New York City

New symbol for the Alliance for Climate Protection

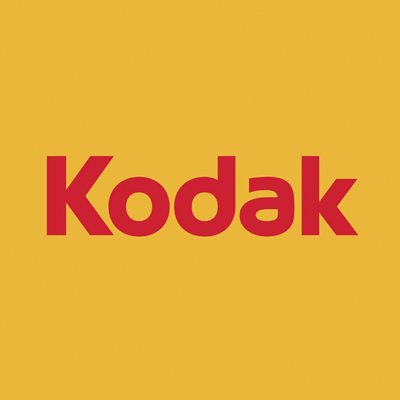
Kodak identity system

Tribeca Film Festival design

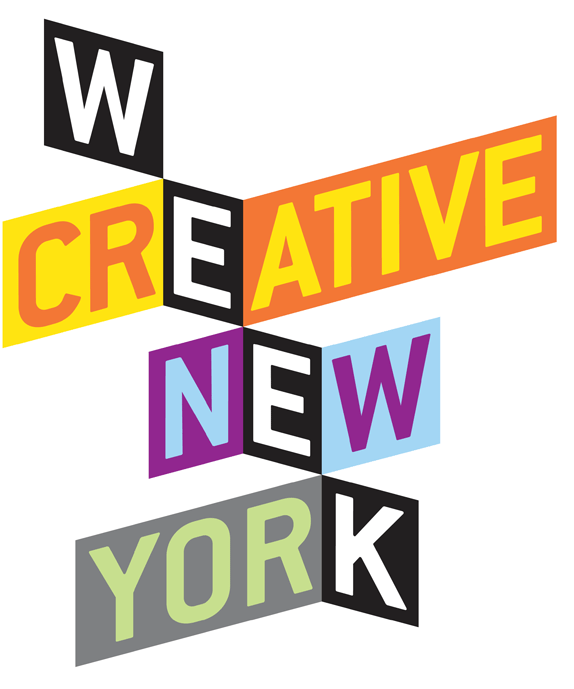
Creative Week New York campaign

Dove "Campaign for Real Beauty" photo exhibit

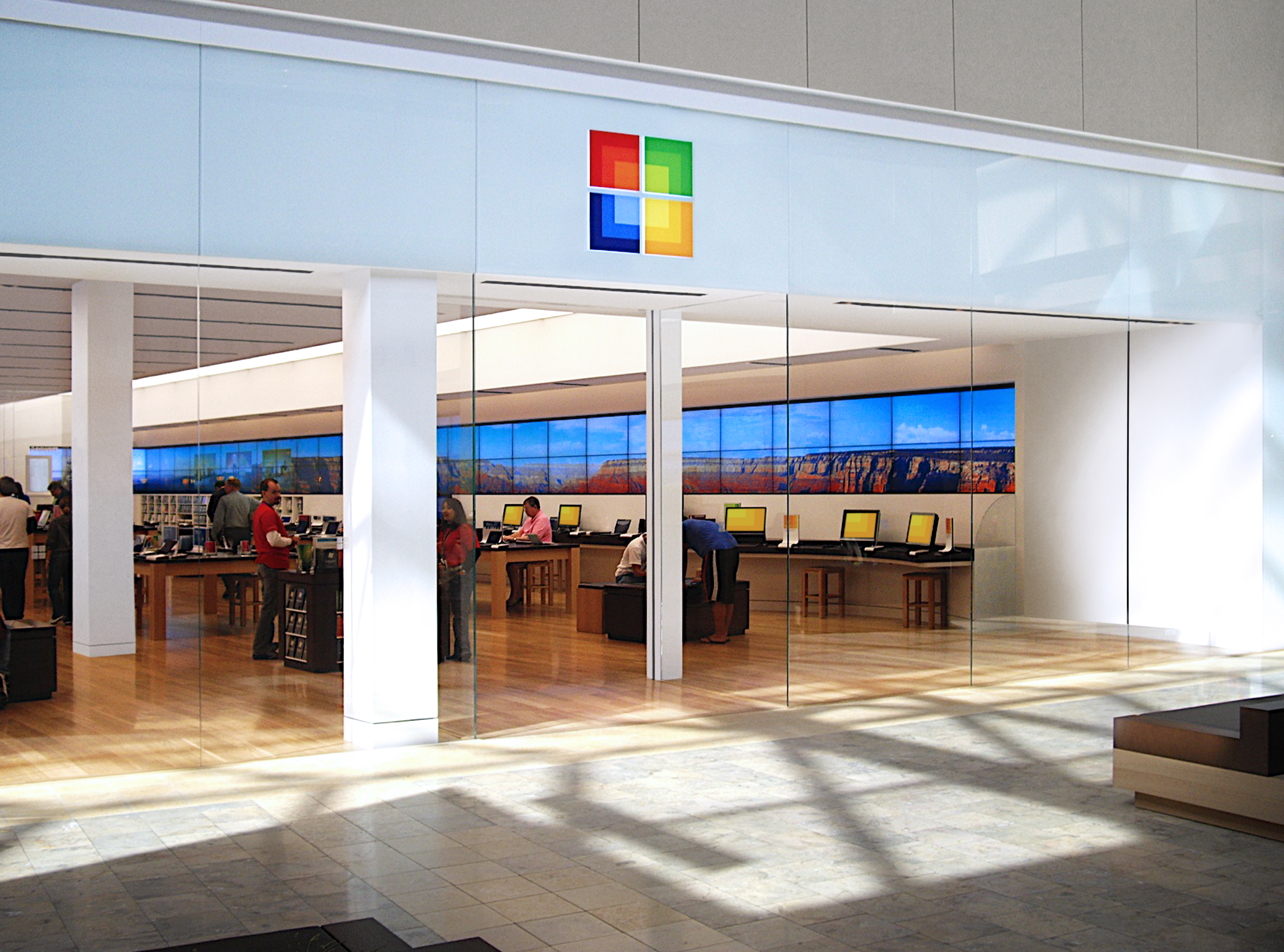
Brand and environment design for the Microsoft Store

New Miller Brewing Co. identity

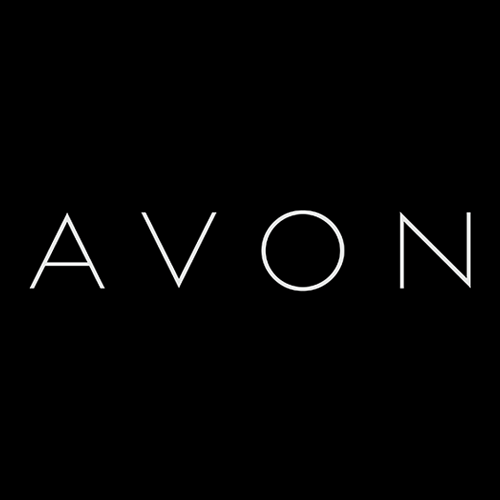
Avon branding and packaging system

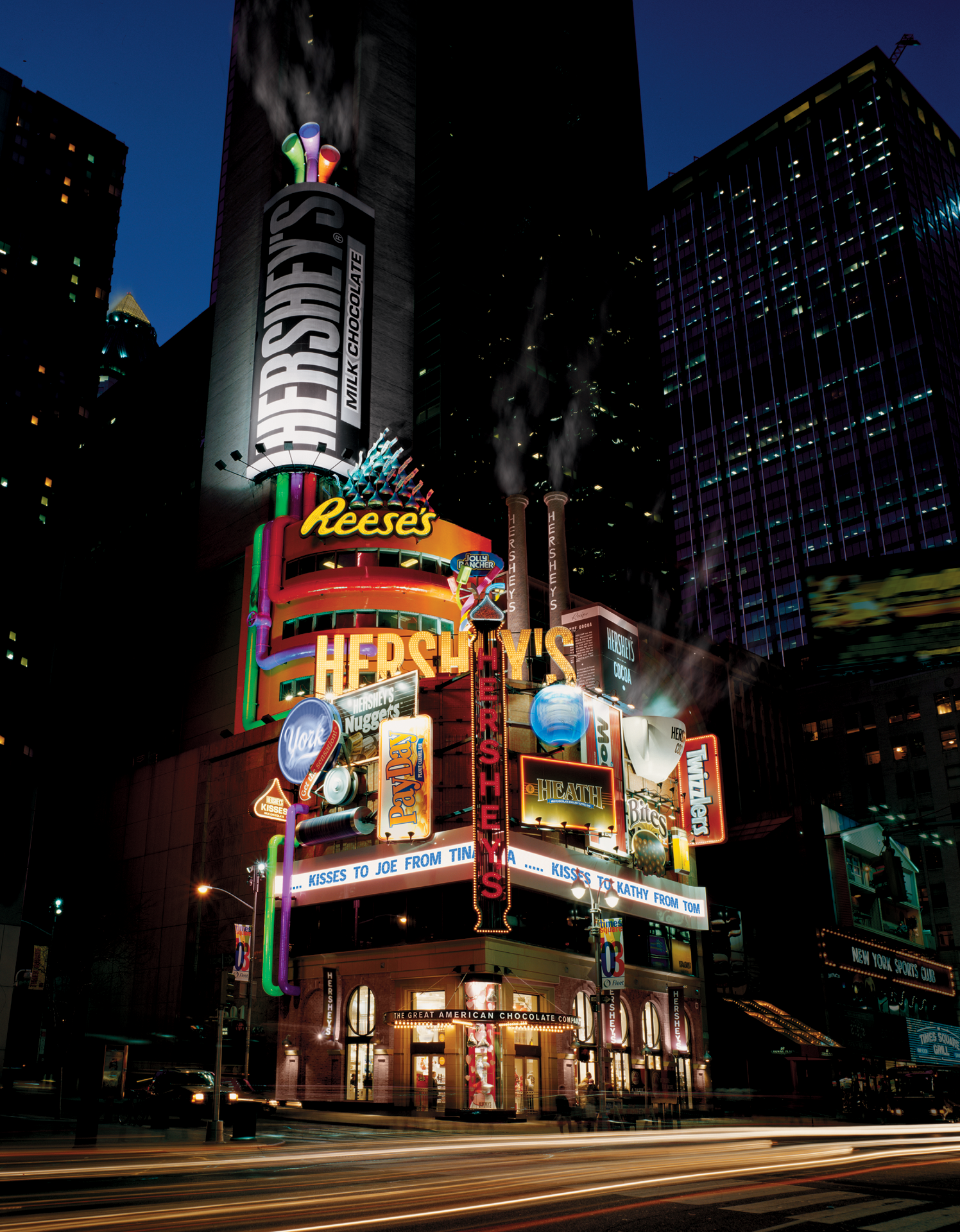
Hershey Store design & experience / Times Square, New York City

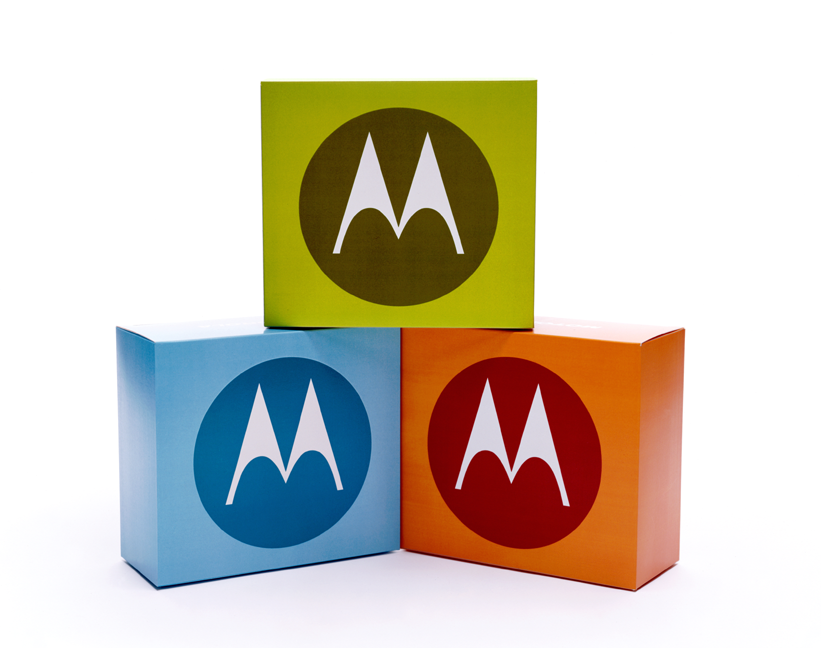
Motorola global identity design system

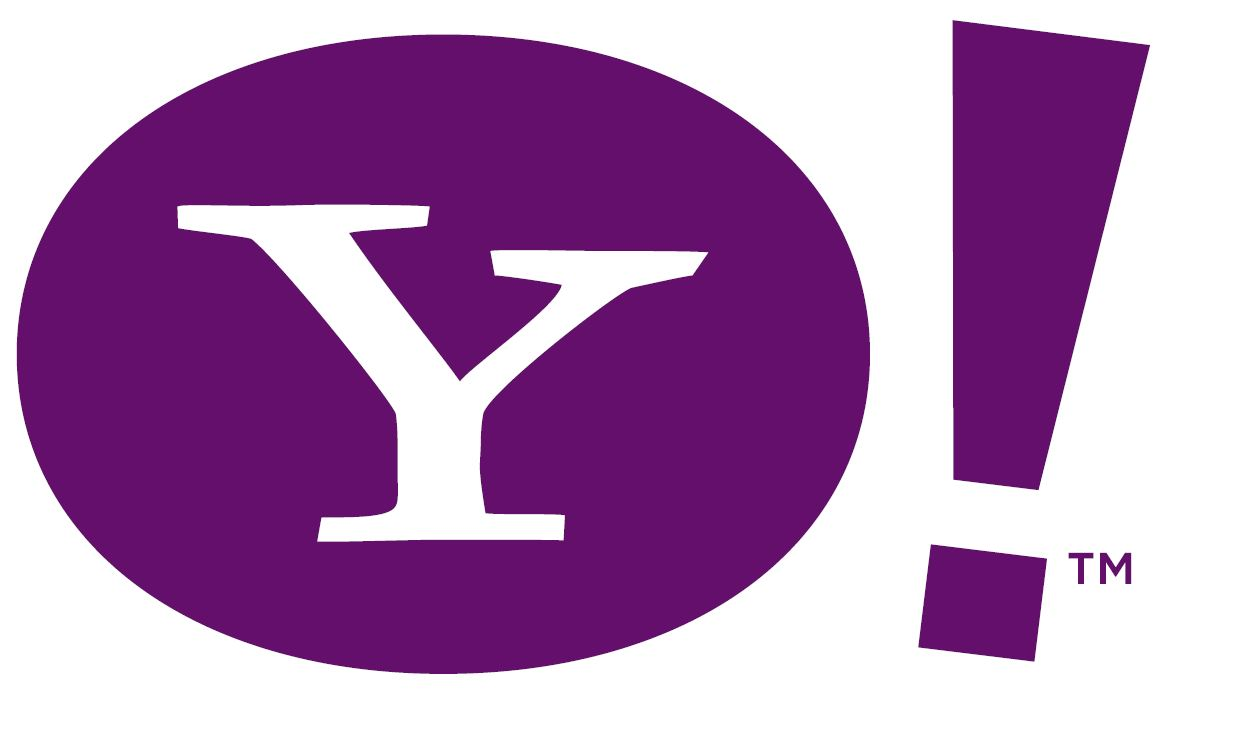
Yahoo identity and design program

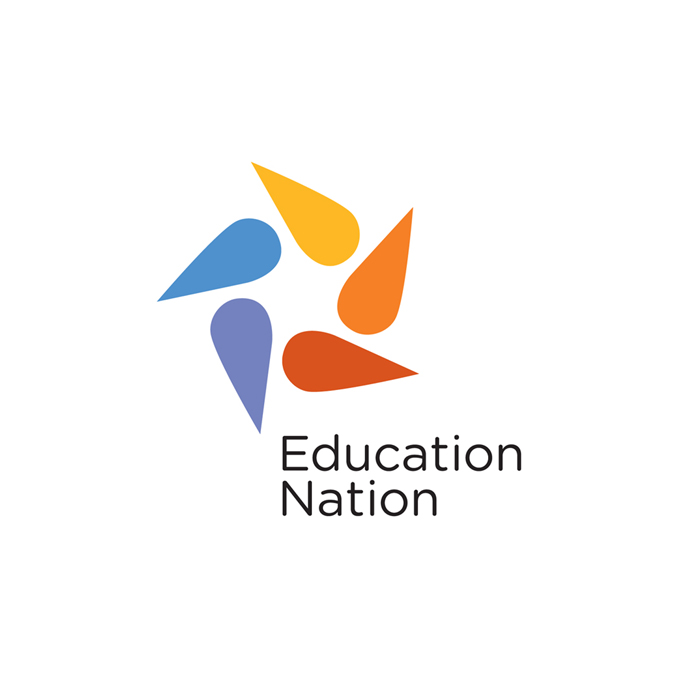
Creative development for the NBC Education Nation
