= Helios House =

- Helios House in 2008
- Interactive map of the Helios House area

General information
- Type: Gasoline service station
- Architectural style: Green
- Location: Pico-Robertson, 8770 W. Olympic Blvd. Los Angeles, CA 90035, Los Angeles, United States
- Coordinates: 34.059260°N 118.383319°W
- Current tenants: Speedway Express
- Opened: 2007; 19 years ago

Technical details
- Material: Recycled stainless steel and wood
- Floor count: 1

Design and construction
- Architecture firm: Office dA & Johnston Marklee

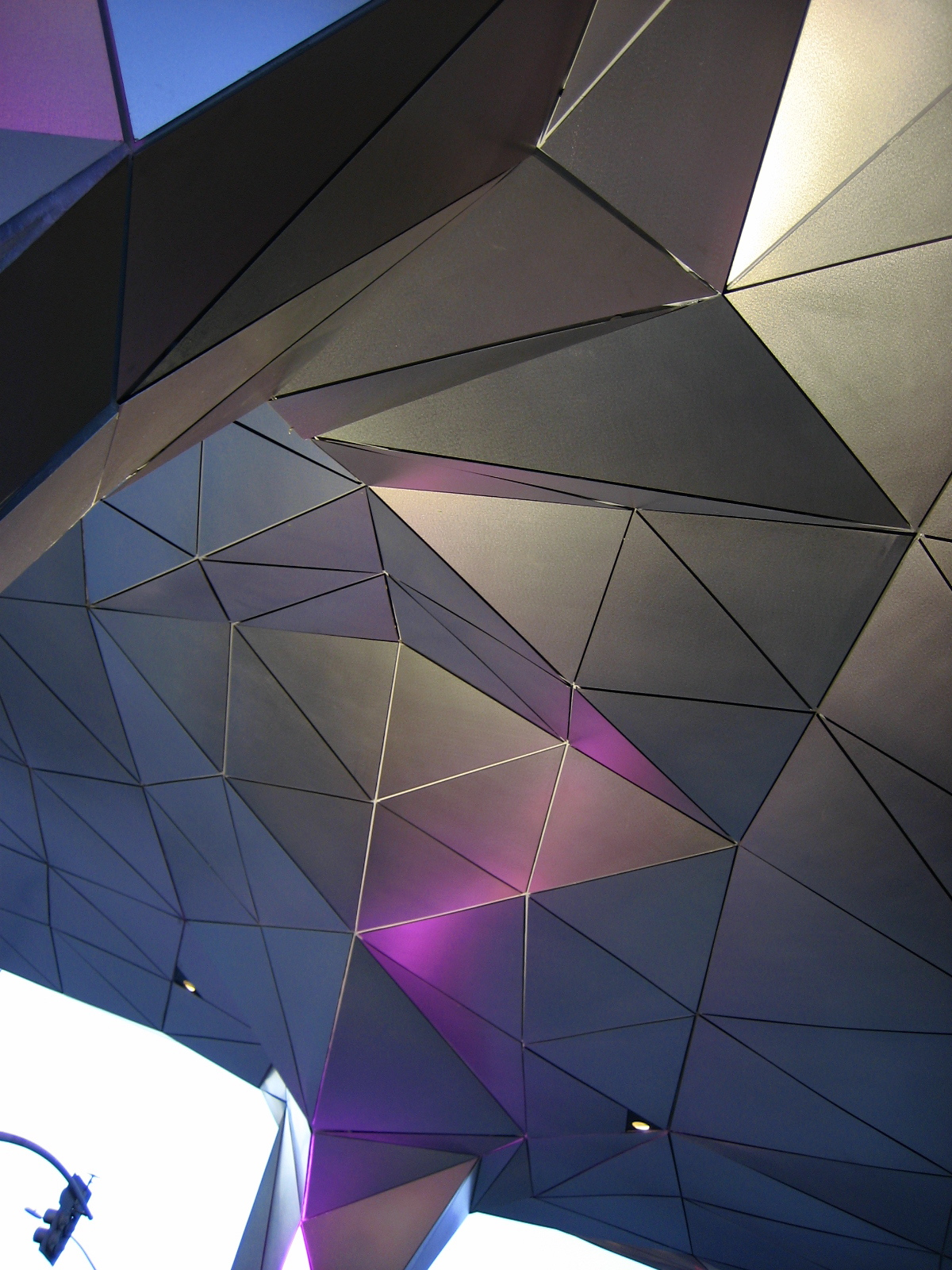
Helios House in 2007

The Helios House is a gas station in Los Angeles, California, United States, located on Olympic Boulevard. It is designed as a green station with special features and is considered to be the "station of the future." It is the first gas station in the world ever to be submitted for LEED certification.

The gas station was designed by Office dA (Principal architects Monica Ponce de Leon and Nader Tehrani) in Boston and Johnston Marklee Architects in Los Angeles. The architects were hired by Ogilvy & Mather, led by Brian Collins. The lead on this project was Ann Hand, and the purpose of the design was to reinvent the gas stations.

The station's roof is designed of triangles made from recycled stainless steel and contains cacti and 90 solar panels. This reduces the energy consumption of the station by 16%. The station's roof is drought tolerant and collects water for irrigation. The station replaced a run-down Thrifty gas station that previously occupied the site.

Built in 2007, it is seen as a Los Angeles landmark. It started out selling BP branded gasoline (at the time, the only BP branded station in the West Coast), but in 2009 switched to its more prominent West Coast sister brand (at the time) ARCO. As of 2021, it is a Speedway Express, a low-volume brand of the Speedway chain, which, in turn, was a former subsidiary of Marathon Petroleum, ARCO's current parent company, and now a subsidiary of Seven & I Holdings, parent company of 7-Eleven.

== Features of the station ==
=== Structural ===
- Made of cradle to cradle recyclable stainless steel
- Farmed wood facade
- CO_{2} reducing landscaping
- Grass planted on roof to reduce the need for mechanical heating or cooling
- Catch basin prevents runoff into ocean
- Canopy collects rainwater used for on-site irrigation and to meet station's water needs
- LOW-VOC paint used in back of building
- Signage made from recycled material

=== Energy saving ===
- Canopy lighting uses up to 20% less energy than traditional gas stations
- LED lighting throughout the station, using low amounts of energy to achieve the same brightness
- Roof contains 90 solar panels, which can produce the energy needed for 2-3 average American homes
- Photocells and timers help customize energy needs to time of day and amount of light

=== Restroom features ===
- Walls made from farmed wood and rapidly renewing bamboo
- Motion sensor lights, reducing energy waste when not in use
- Bathroom sinks are made out of recycled aluminum shavings
- Floor tiles made from recycled glass
- Low water volume faucets, which shut off automatically when not in use to prevent water waste

=== Other ===
- On-site recycling of paper, cans, bottles, and cell phones is provided
- Maintenance conducted with recycled, eco-friendly products
- Old materials used in construction have been re-used or recycled
