= Malcolm McCullough =

American academic and urban planner

Academic background
- Education: Yale University (B.A.); University of California, Los Angeles (M.Arch.)

Academic work
- Discipline: Architect
- Sub-discipline: Urban designer
- Institutions: Carnegie Mellon University; Harvard University; University of Michigan
- Main interests: Interaction design; Urban computing; Urban resilience

Malcolm McCullough is an urban designer and professor at the University of Michigan's Taubman College of Architecture and Urban Planning, where he helped create the United States' first undergraduate degree in urban technology.

Before joining the University of Michigan in 2001, he taught at Carnegie Mellon University from 1998 to 2000 and at the Harvard University Graduate School of Design from 1988 to 1998.

McCullough earned his Masters of Architecture from the University of California, Los Angeles, and his B.A. in engineering and architecture from Yale University.

He is considered a pioneer in urban computing, having served as the first Architecture Product Manager at Autodesk. He has written several books about concepts such as interaction design and urban resilience.

== Bibliography ==
- Downtime on the Microgrid, MIT Press, 2020.
- Ambient Commons, MIT Press, 2014.
- Digital Ground, MIT Press, 2004.
- Abstracting Craft, 1996.
- Digital Design Media, 1994.
- The Electronic Design Studio, 1990.
