= Mónica Ponce de León =

American architect

- Education: University of Miami (BArch); Harvard University (MAUD)
- Occupation: Architect
- Awards: Cooper-Hewitt National Design Award (2007); Harleston Parker Medal (2002); Progressive Architecture Award; National Academy of Design (2016)
- Practice: MPdL Studio (2011–present); Office dA (1991–2010)
- Buildings: Macallen Building (2007); Helios House (2007); RISD Fleet Library (2006)
- Projects: Ventulett installation at the Georgia Institute of Technology
- Website: http://www.mpdlstudio.com/

Mónica Ponce de León is a Latina architect, educator, and dean of the Princeton University School of Architecture.

A National Design Award winner, Ponce de León has focused on the application of robotic technology to building fabrication and architecture education. Her interdisciplinary practice, MPdL Studio, has offices in New York City, Boston, Princeton, New Jersey, and Ann Arbor, Michigan. Ponce de León previously served as Dean of the A. Alfred Taubman College of Architecture and Urban Planning at the University of Michigan (2008–2015) and as Professor at the Graduate School of Design at Harvard University (1996–2008). Prior to establishing her own practice MPdL Studio in 2011, she was the founding partner with Nader Tehrani in the award-winning firm Office dA.

== Early life and education ==
Ponce de León immigrated to Miami, Florida, with her family after graduating high school. She took English classes and worked in a millwork shop before enrolling at the University of Miami, where she earned her Bachelor of Architecture degree in 1989. In 1991, she received a Master of Architecture in Urban Design from the Harvard Graduate School of Design.

Mónica Ponce de León

7th Dean of Princeton University School of Architecture
- Incumbent
- Assumed office 2016
- Preceded by: Mario Gandelsonas

== Career ==
After graduating from Harvard, she held teaching appointments at Harvard University, Southern California Institute of Architecture, Rhode Island School of Design, University of Houston, and Northeastern University while establishing Office dA.

=== Harvard University Graduate School of Design ===
From 1996 until 2008, Ponce de León was professor of architecture, director of the digital lab, and acting architecture program director at Harvard University Graduate School of Design. At Harvard, she developed the first robotic fabrication lab in an architecture school in the United States. During her tenure at Harvard, she also held visiting positions at the Southern California Institute of Architecture and the Georgia Institute of Technology, and gave over 60 lectures and symposia on her work, which were published in over 200 publications worldwide

=== Taubman College of Architecture and Urban Planning ===
Ponce de León served as Dean the Taubman College of Architecture and Urban Planning at the University of Michigan from 2008 until 2015. At Michigan she developed new educational models that emphasized experimentation. She opened the Liberty Annex, a think tank for faculty creative practices, paired with two competitive grant programs, "Research Through Making" and "Research on the City." At Michigan, she also developed the largest robotic fabrication facility in any school of architecture in the United States. Available to both students and faculty for learning, teaching and research, this model has become the standard for other schools of architecture in the country. At Michigan, Ponce de Leon with Associate Dean Milton Curry, also inaugurated an architecture preparatory program for high school students in Detroit. In collaboration with several high schools in Detroit, the program offers design studio instruction high school credit in math and the visual arts. By December 2016 close to 200 students had graduated from the program.

After the disbanding of Office dA in 2010, Monica Ponce de León established her own practice, MPdL Studio with offices in New York City, Boston, and Ann Arbor.

=== Princeton University School of Architecture ===
In 2015, Ponce de León announced her departure from Michigan to become the new Dean of the Princeton University School of Architecture.

In 2016, Ponce de León served as co-curator, alongside Log editor Cynthia Davidson, of the exhibition at the United States Pavilion for the 15th International Biennale of Architecture in Venice, Italy. The exhibition, entitled "The Architectural Imagination" and to be organized and hosted by Taubman College, will engage specific sites in Detroit, and feature projects from 12 teams of architects from across the United States.

== Projects ==
Helios House in Los Angeles

Among others, her projects include: Fabricating Coincidences in New York, Helios House in Los Angeles, Macallen Building and the Interfaith Chapel in Boston, and Dining Services at 200 West and Conrad Hilton in Lower Manhattan. In 2006, she designed the RISD Fleet Library at the Rhode Island School of Design.

Fabricating Coincidences was a 1998 installation in the Museum of Modern Art that serves as an early example of the potential of digital fabrication in architecture. In his review of the exhibition for the New York Times, Herbert Mushamp writes: "'Congratulations. Grade: A. Humpty Dumpty has a very graceful fall. Propped against the brick wall that encloses the garden along its northern edge, the piece is made of perforated steel plate that has been folded, origami style, into a canopy of cascading metal. The project looks like a staircase, but climbing is not recommended. About halfway up, the horizontal folds start sloping precariously upwards. The piece does nifty visual tricks. Depending on the light, the metal plate can switch from opaque to a semi-transparent scrim. Viewed from straight ahead, the folds collapse into a single plane; as you move around, the forms expand into space, like an escalator for the eye. This may not be masterpiece material, but it's an inventive appetizer. These are architects to watch." Of her Dining Services project, Paul Goldberger of The New Yorker writes in 2010, "spectacular cafeteria, with a swooping white plaster ceiling and columns, a modernist take on Gaudi that plays off deftly against Cobb's geometric shell." Her office building for Amanda manufacturing is regarded as a transformative critique of the workplace, subverts traditional corporate hierarchy by merging a forest of structural columns with vertical skylights to democratize natural light across an open floor plan. Reviewing the project, critic Matthew Marani praised this layout as a "sleight of hand to democratize access to daylight," while Raymund Ryan described it as “original thinking about structure, light, and communal space.”.

== Honors and awards ==
Ponce de León received both the Young Architects Award in 1997 and the Emerging Voices Award in 2003 from the Architectural League of New York. In 2002, she received an Academy Award in Architecture from the American Academy of Arts and Letters and in 2008 she was named a United States Artist fellow.

In 2007, Ponce de León received the Cooper-Hewitt National Design Award in Architecture, the first Hispanic architect to receive this honor.

Her work has received numerous awards, including more than a dozen Progressive Architecture awards, the Harleston Parker Medal (2002), as well as citations from the American Institute of Architects, I.D. Magazine, and the Boston Society of Architects. In 2008, the Macallen Building was named one of the Top Ten Green Projects by the American Institute of Architects Committee on the Environment.

In 2016, Ponce de Leon was elected to the National Academy of Design.

In 2020, Ponce de Leon was named by Carnegie Corporation of New York as an honoree of the Great Immigrants Award

In 2026, Ponce de Leon was elected to the National Academy of Arts and Letters, the only architect to be appointed that year.
