= Christophe Van Gerrewey =

Belgian writer and architect

- Born: 1982 (age 43–44)
- Occupations: Architectural theorist; Literary theorist; Author; Architect

Academic background
- Education: Architecture; Literary studies
- Alma mater: Ghent University; KU Leuven

Academic work
- Discipline: Theory of architecture
- Institutions: École Polytechnique Fédérale de Lausanne
- Website: https://acht.epfl.ch

Christophe Van Gerrewey (born 1982) is a Belgian architectural and literary theorist, writer and architect. He is currently tenure track professor for architectures, criticism, history and theory at the School of Architecture, Civil and Environmental Engineering (ENAC) of the École Polytechnique Fédérale de Lausanne (EPFL).

== Career ==
Gerrewey studied architecture at Ghent University and literary science at KU Leuven, and completed a PhD on "Architecture a user manual. Theory, Critique and History since 1950" on the work of architecture critic Geert Bekaert. Since 2015, Van Gerrewey leads as tenure track professor the laboratory of Architecture, Critique, History, and Theory (ACHT) at École Polytechnique Fédérale de Lausanne (EPFL), Switzerland. He teaches architecture theory.

== Research ==
The main objective of his research and of his lab ACHT is developing a comprehensive understanding of contemporary architecture as a cultural discipline in Western Europe. The method of his research is threefold: critical evaluation of contemporary projects and developments, historical study post-war trends, oeuvres and evolution) and theoretical investigation of the cultural conditions of architectural production since the late 19th century.

Gerrewey's current research focuses on the critical reception of the work of OMA/Rem Koolhaas (1975-1999), the genesis of the Kunsthal in Rotterdam by OMA/Rem Koolhaas (1987-1992), architectural writers of the twentieth century, the relationship between architecture and philosophy since the Second World War, and a short history of metropolitan theory in Switzerland.

His texts on architecture, literature, performing arts and visual arts have appeared in magazines such as De Witte Raaf, Etcetera, Ons Erfdeel, De Leeswolf, Domus, De Brakke Dog, De Gids, nY, A +, NRC Handelsblad, Streven, De Groene Amsterdammer, Rekto: Verso, The Architect, The Reactor and Metropolis M. He is a member of the editorial board of the art and architectural magazine De Witte Raaf.

== Literary works ==
In 2010, the collection Five disease stories was published. In 2012, Gerrewey published his debut novel Op de hoogte in Antwerp, a novel in letter form about love lost. In 2013 he received the Debuutprijs from boek.be for this, in 2014 the literary prize for East Flanders and in 2016 the "European Union Literature Prize 2016". In 2013 his second novel, Train with delay, was published. In 2015, the essay collection Over everything and for everyone followed. In 2017, his novel Werk Werk Werk was published by Polis.

== Distinctions ==
=== Awards ===
- European Union Literature Prize 2016 for the novel Op de hoogte (De Bezige Bij, Amsterdam, 2012)
- Prize for Young Art Competition, Review category and Essay category (2008)
- Essay prize from Philosophy Magazine (2000)

=== Memberships ===
- Member of the editorial board of PostWarHistories
- Member of the editorial team of OASE and De Witte Raaf
- Visiting critic at the Architectural Association, London

== Key publications ==
- Van Gerrewey, C. (ed) (2019) OMA/Rem Koolhaas: A Critical Anthology from Delirious New York to S,M,L,XL. Basel: Birkhäuser.
- Van Gerrewey, C. (2017) ‘War of the Worlds. Zaha Hadid’s Port House in Antwerp’, The Architectural Review, 241, no. 1447, pp. 68–77.
- Van Gerrewey, C. (2017) ‘Something Completely Different’, E-Flux Architecture, 15.
- Van Gerrewey, C. (2016) ‘Abandon Your Pencils. The Use and Abuse of Architecture Theory for Life’, Archithese, no. 2, pp. 33–37.
- Van Gerrewey, C. (2015) ‘How Soon Is Now? Ten Problems and Paradoxes in the Work of Dogma’, LOG, no. 35 (2015), pp. 27–47.
