= Sarah Whiting =

American architect (born 1964)

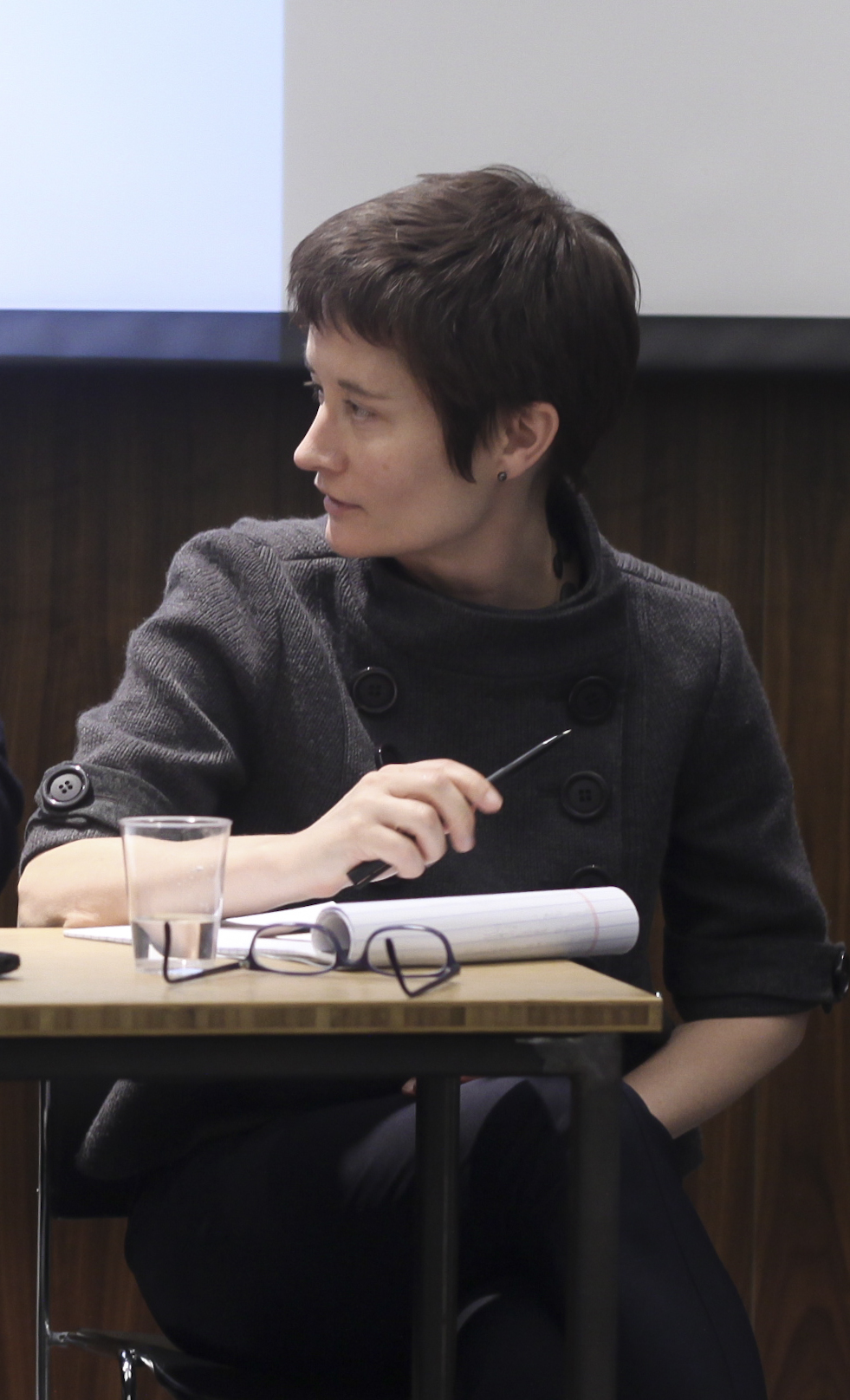
- Whiting in 2013.
- Born: 1964 (age 61–62)
- Education: Princeton University; Yale University; Massachusetts Institute of Technology
- Occupation: Architect
- Spouse: Ron Witte
- Practice: WW Architecture
- Website: Official site

Sarah M. Whiting (born 1964) is an American architect, critic, and academic administrator. Whiting is currently Dean and Josep Lluís Sert Professor of Architecture at Harvard Graduate School of Design, in addition to being a founding partner of WW Architecture, along with her husband, Ron Witte. She previously served as Dean and William Ward Watkin Professor of Architecture at Rice School of Architecture. In addition to her work as an academic administrator, Whiting is most commonly identified as an intellectual figure within the field of architecture's "post-critical" turn in the early 2000s.

== Early life and education ==
Whiting was born with her twin brother in 1964. Her father, Charles G. Whiting, attended Yale University for undergrad and his doctorate, and had begun working as a professor of French literature at Northwestern University the year prior to her birth. Her mother, Monique, was originally from France.

Whiting "first explored architecture when her eighth grade teacher in Evanston, Illinois assigned students to choose a future career and write a report" and she choose to profile a local architect. Whiting attended Evanston Township High School, where she was part of the French Club and graduated in 1982. She then attended Yale University, where she received a Bachelor of Arts degree in architectural, urban history, and theory. At Yale, she was also an editor for the arts section of the Yale Daily News. Whiting subsequently obtained a Master of Architecture from Princeton University in 1990, and a Doctor of Philosophy in the History and Theory of Architecture from the Massachusetts Institute of Technology in 2001. Her PhD dissertation, advised by the architectural historian Stanford Anderson, was entitled "The Jungle in the Clearing: Space, Form, and Democracy in America, 1940-1949."

== Career ==
Whiting worked in the offices of Peter Eisenman, Michael Graves, and the Office for Metropolitan Architecture, where she served as a designer on the Euralille master plan and assisted with the publication SMLXL. Along with her husband, Ron Witte, Whiting also co-founded WW Architecture, an architecture firm that is now located in Cambridge, Massachusetts.

She has taught at institutions such as Harvard University, Princeton University, the Illinois Institute of Technology, the University of Kentucky, and the University of Florida, where she led undergraduate and graduate level courses on modern urbanism and contemporary architectural theory.

On July 1, 2019, Whiting was named Dean and Professor of Architecture at the Harvard University Graduate School of Design. She became the first female dean in the school's history, and replaced Mohsen Mostafavi. Her endowed chair is named after Josep Lluís Sert.

Whiting notably contributed to the postcritical turn in architectural practice and discourse, often identified through her widely cited essay, co-authored with Robert Somol, "Notes Around the Doppler Effect and Other Moods of Modernism," published by Yale's Perspecta journal in 2002.

== Personal life ==
Whiting is married to Ron Witte, who is a co-founder of WW Architecture. Witte, who has served as a professor at the Rice University School of Architecture, is currently a visiting professor of architecture at the Harvard University Graduate School of Design.

Her twin brother, Alex Whiting, who currently serves as Head of Investigations for the Kosovo Specialist Chambers and Specialist Prosecutor's Office, was an assistant clinical professor at Harvard Law School from 2007 to 2010 and a professor of practice at Harvard Law School from 2013 to 2019. Whiting also has a sister Cécile and a brother Peter.

== Bibliography ==
- Beyond Surface Appeal: Literalism, Sensibilities and Constituencies in the Work of James Carpenter, 2012, ISBN 978-1934510179
- "Notes Around the Doppler Effect and Other Moods of Modernism" (with Robert Somol), Perspecta 33 (2002): 72–77
- "Oxymoron and Pleonasm Conversation on American Critical by Monika Mitasova (Editor)", 2014, ISBN 9781940291413
- "Shaping the City by Edward Robbins (Editor); Rodolphe El-Khoury (Editor)", (2004):57-76, ISBN 0415261899
- "Differences by Ignasi de Solà-Morales; Sarah Whiting (Editor); Graham Thompson (Translator)", 2004, ISBN 0415261899
- "Peter Eisenman in Dialogue with architects and philosophers", (with Peter Eisenman and others), 2017, ISBN 9788869771132

Preceded by Mohsen Mostafavi	Dean; Harvard University Graduate School of Design; July 1, 2019 – present	Succeeded by Incumbent
