= Robert Somol =

American architectural theorist

Robert E. Somol Jr. is an architectural theorist and was director of the School of Architecture at the University of Illinois at Chicago from 2007 to 2022. His writing has been centrally-linked to "post-critical" architectural theory at the turn of the 21st century; the concept is similar to that of postcritique found in literary criticism.

== Education and career ==
He holds an A.B. from Brown University (1982), a J.D. from Harvard Law School, and a Ph.D. in the history of culture from the University of Chicago (1997). Previously a professor in the Knowlton School of Architecture at the Ohio State University, he has taught design and theory at Princeton University, UCLA, the University of Illinois at Chicago, Rice University, Columbia University, the University of Michigan, and the Harvard Graduate School of Design. Somol was formerly a principal at the Los Angeles architecture firm P XS. He is the co-designer of "off-use," an award-winning studio and residence in Los Angeles (2002) that "combines the speculative discipline of modernism with the material excesses of mass culture." He is also a member of the Research Board of the Berlage Institute in Rotterdam. He was the guest editor for volume five of the contemporary architecture journal Log and served as a member of its editorial board, ANY, which explored the cultural role of architecture and its relationships to other disciplines.

== Writing ==
His writings, which have appeared in publications ranging from Assemblage to Wired, focus on modernism and its modes of repetition, the emergence of the diagram in postwar architecture, landscape and interior urbanism, and the criticism of contemporary architectural practices and pedagogy.

=== The Post-critical Turn ===
His writing has been centrally-linked to the "post-critical turn" in architectural theory and culture. While firmly contextualized within the discourse of architecture theory, the "turn" shares similarities to the idea of postcritique found in literary criticism. Somol's most notable contribution to this discourse came via his widely-cited essay, co-authored with Sarah Whiting, "Notes Around the Doppler Effect and Other Moods of Modernism," published by MIT's Perspecta journal in 2002. Observers have dubbed the essay "the true birth certificate of post-criticality," and that its thesis attempted to commit "symbolic 'patricide' on the previous generation of theorists whose discourse dominated the pages of Oppositions and Assemblage in the 1970s and 1980s." As architectural historian Robert Cowherd describes, "Somol and Whiting proceed within the recognisable framework of theory while venturing beyond the critical autonomy of a ‘hot’ avant-garde to examine a set o f ‘cool’ projects with an eye towards their performance in solving (non-theoretical) problems in the world of everyday experience." The term is often also tied to the architectural theorist Michael Speaks and the architect and writer, Rem Koolhaas.

== Bibliography ==
=== Books ===
- Somol, R.E. (ed.) Autonomy and Ideology: Positioning an Avant-Garde in America (Monacelli Press, 1997)

=== Articles and Essays ===
- Somol, R.E. and Whiting, Sarah. "Notes around the Doppler Effect and Other Moods of Modernism." Perspecta 33 (2002): 72–77.
- Somol, R.E. "Green Dots 101." Hunch 11 (2007): 28–37.
- Somol, R.E. "12 Reasons to Get Back in Shape." In Content, edited by Office of Metropolitan Architecture. and Rem Koolhaas. Köln: Taschen, 2004.
