= Drosscape =

Drosscape is an urban design framework that looks at urbanized regions as the waste product of defunct economic and industrial processes. The concept was realized by Alan Berger, professor of urban design at MIT, and is part of a new vocabulary and aesthetic that could be useful for the redesign and adaptive reuse of ‘waste landscapes’ within urbanized regions.

== Definition and application ==
According to Berger, drosscape, as a concept, implies that dross, or waste, may be "scaped", or resurfaced, and reprogrammed for adaptive reuse. Berger goes on to explain that this phenomenon emerges from two primary processes. Firstly, Drosscape surfaces as a byproduct of rapid urbanization and horizontal growth urban sprawl. Secondly, these spaces arise as a consequence of defunct economic and production systems. For urban planners, architects and other design professionals, drosscape may offer another creative way to envision space and landscape design in a city. According to Berger, “Adaptively reusing this waste landscape figures to be one of the twenty-first century’s great infrastructural design challenges.”

These waste places have risen from deindustrialization as well as industrial growth, the latter having replaced old technologies with new ones... leading to “creative destruction”, or the abolishment of the obsolete. This concept also forgives sprawl, explaining that industrial growth and success in urban centers causes this inevitable, horizontal movement, and isn’t intrinsically bad. Again, this will require a new line of thinking, as we’ve been trained to fear sprawl and to despise the landscape that humans have created. Once the waste landscapes are identified, it will be the job of the entrepreneurial design professional to integrate and re-use these spaces in the urban world.

== Examples ==
Berger cites the following examples as demonstrating the horizontal urbanization which results in "wasted landscapes".

- California Speedway (former steel mill site), Fontana, California
- Trinity River Corridor, Dallas Texas
- Global III Intermodal Terminal.Rochelle, Illinois
- U.S. Steel Plant. South Side Chicago, Illinois
- Inman Yard. Norfolk Southern Railway, Atlanta, Georgia
