= Greg Lynn =

American architect

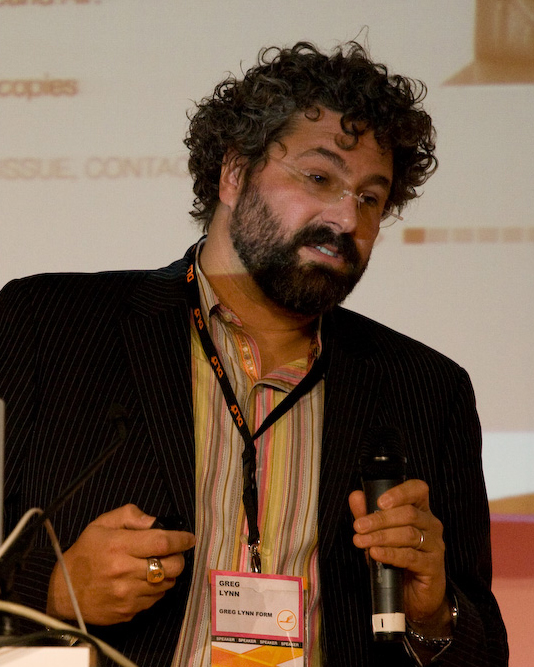
- Born: 1964 (age 61–62); North Olmsted, Ohio, United States
- Education: Miami University, Princeton University
- Occupation: Architect
- Practice: Greg Lynn FORM
- Website: glform.com

Greg Lynn (born 1964) is an American architect, founder and owner of the Greg Lynn FORM office, a Full Professor at the Institute of Architecture at the University of Applied Arts Vienna and a professor at the UCLA School of the Arts and Architecture. He is CEO and co-founder of the Boston-based robotics company Piaggio Fast Forward. He won a Golden Lion at the 2008 Venice Biennale of Architecture. In 2010 Lynn was named a fellow by United States Artists. He is a member of the board of trustees of the Canadian Centre for Architecture.

== Life and works ==
Lynn was born in North Olmsted, Ohio, and claims always to have wanted to be an architect. "When I was twelve, I could already construct perspective drawings and draw axonometric projections", says Lynn. "In high school, someone taught drafting and in the first day of class they saw that I could do all these constructed drawings. I started picking oddly-shaped objects like threaded cones and I would try to draw them in two-point perspective. I got into drawing as a kind of sport." Lynn graduated cum laude from Miami University in Ohio with degrees in architecture and philosophy and from Princeton University School of Architecture with a Master of Architecture. He is distinguished for his use of computer-aided design to produce irregular, biomorphic architectural forms, as he proposes that with the use of computers, calculus can be implemented into the generation of architectural expression. Lynn has written extensively on these ideas, first in 1993 as the editor of an Architectural Design special issue called "Folding in Architecture". In 1999, his book Animate FORM, funded in part by the Graham Foundation focused on the use of animation and motion graphic software for design. His book, Folds, Bodies & Blobs: Collected Essays, contains the republished essay from ANY magazine "Blobs, or Why Tectonics is Square and Topology is Groovy" in which he coined the term "blob architecture" later to become "blobitecture" popularized in a New York Times Magazine article "On Language: Defenestration" by William Safire. The 2008 book Greg Lynn FORM, edited with Mark Rappolt, includes contributions by his colleagues, collaborators and critics including Ross Lovegrove, Jeffrey Kipnis, Chris Bangle, Sylvia Lavin, Imaginary Forces, Peter Schröder, Bruce Sterling, J. G. Ballard, Brian Goodwin and Ari Marcopoulos. He was one of the earliest teachers to explore the use of the digital technology for building design and construction when he was teaching "Paperless Studios" with Hani Rashid and Stan Allen while Bernard Tschumi was dean of Columbia Graduate School of Architecture, Planning and Preservation from 1992 to 1999. He was professor of spatial conception and exploration at the ETH Zurich Faculty of Architecture from 1999 to 2002 and was Davenport Visiting professor at the Yale School of Architecture from 1999 to 2016.

Lynn's New York Presbyterian Church in Queens, New York, with Douglas Garofalo, Michael McInturf is an early project which used vector-based animation software in its design conception. He was profiled by Time magazine in their projection of 21st-century innovators in the field of architecture and design.

Lynn's latest works begin to explore how to integrate structure and form together as he discovered some biomorphic forms are inherently resistant to load. He often experiments with methods of manufacturing from the aerospace, boat building and automobile industries in his installations such as Swarovski crystal sails and HSBC Designers Lounge for 2009 Design Miami, Bubbles in the Wine installation at the Grimaldi Forum in Monaco, 1999 The Predator at Wexner Center for the Arts with Fabian Marcaccio, 2002 Expanding the Gap installation at Eigelstein 115 (Martin Rendel and René Spitz) with Ross Lovegrove and Tokujin Yoshioka, and in his industrial design projects like the super formed titanium Alessi Tea and Coffee Towers of 2003 and the Vitra Ravioli Chair. Working with Panelite his studio invented a hollow plastic brick called the Blobwall and using an upcycling approach to design and materials is repurposing children's toys as the building bricks for Recycled Toys Furniture, and a Fountain of Toys at the Hammer Museum by scanning rotomolded plastic toys, composing them on a computer, cutting them with a five-axis CNC router and assembling them into welded monolithic objects. The Bloom House includes curvaceous interior elements and windows, built in plastics, fiberglass and wood all using this software and CNC controlled machines for its fabrication.

== Publications ==
- Animate FORM, Princeton Architectural Press, New York, 1999 & 2011 ISBN 978-1568980836
- Folding in Architecture: Architectural Design Profile 102, Academy Editions, London, 1995 ISBN 978-0470092187
- Folds, Bodies & Blobs: Collected Essays, La Lettre volée, Brussels, 1998 ISBN 978-2873170684
- Archaeology of the Digital, Sternberg Press co-publisher with Canadian Centre for Architecture, 2013 ISBN 978-3-943365-80-1
- Greg Lynn FORM, with Mark Rappolt, Rizzoli International Publications, New York, 2008 ISBN 978-0-8478-3102-9
- Log 36: Robolog, with Cynthia Davidson, Anyone Corporation, New York, 2016 ISBN 978-0-9907352-4-3
- Composites, Surfaces and Software: High Performance Architecture, with Mark Foster Gage, Yale School of Architecture, New Haven, 2011 ISBN 978-0-393-73333-4
- Architectural Laboratories, with Hani Rashid, NAI Publishers, Rotterdam, 2003 ISBN 978-9056622411
- Architecture for an Embryologic Housing, IT Revolution in Architecture
- Intricacy, with Claudia Gould, ICA Philadelphia, 2003 ISBN 978-0884541028

== Selected exhibitions ==
- Other Space Odysseys: Greg Lynn, Michael Maltzan, Alessandro Poli, Montreal, Canadian Centre for Architecture, April 8 to September 19, 2010
- Archaeology of the Digital, Canadian Centre for Architecture, Montreal, May 7 to October 13, 2013
- Close-Up, Southern California Institute of Architecture, Los Angeles, March 11 to May 29, 2016 (includes projects by Greg Lynn)
- A New Sculpturalism: Contemporary Architecture from Southern California, Museum of Contemporary Art, Los Angeles, June 16 to September 16, 2016 (includes 11 projects by Greg Lynn FORM)
- Archaeology of the Digital: Complexity and Convention, Yale School of Architecture
