= Michael Rock (graphic designer) =

American graphic designer

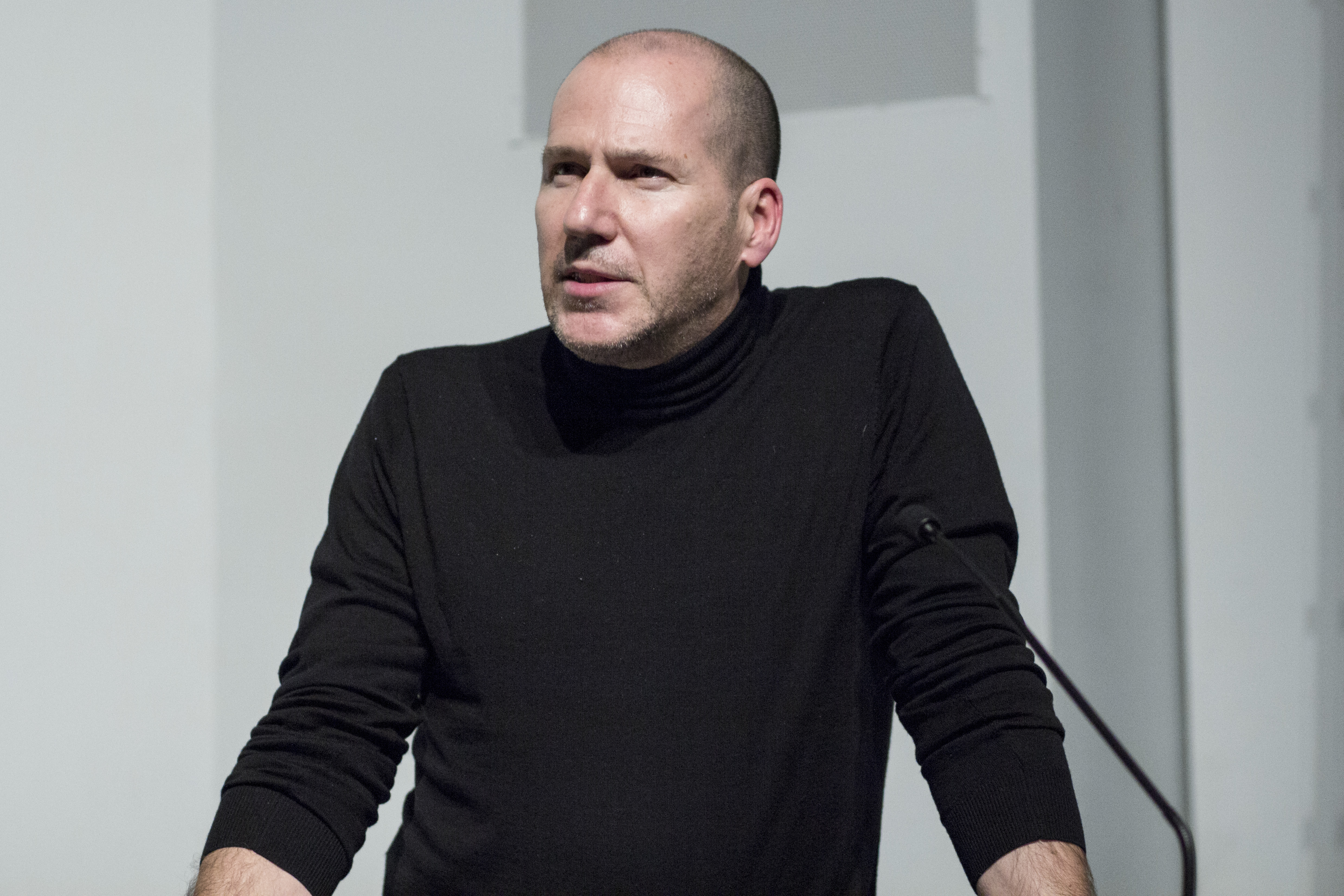
- Rock speaking at Columbia University, 2015
- Born: 1959 (age 66–67)
- Education: Rhode Island School of Design
- Occupations: Partner, 2x4 (1994–present)
- Known for: Graphic designer, creative director

Michael Rock (born 1959) is an American graphic designer and recipient of the National Design Award.

== Biography ==
Michael Rock grew up in Warwick, Rhode Island. He received a B.A. in Humanities from Union College in 1981, before going on to receive a M.F.A. in Graphic Design from the Rhode Island School of Design.

In 1994, Rock, alongside designers Susan Sellers and Georgianna Stout, became a founding partner of 2x4, a design firm based in New York City. 2×4 has worked on a wide range of projects for brands such as Prada, Nike, Kanye West, Barneys New York, Harvard and CCTV. The firm currently has two offices, one in New York City on Varick Street and another in Beijing. The firm is particularly known for their work for fashion houses like Prada, Miu Miu, and Chanel.

Rock has previously held teaching or fellowship positions at the Columbia Graduate School of Architecture, Planning and Preservation, the Yale School of Art, the Harvard Graduate School of Design, the Rhode Island School of Design, and the Jan van Eyck Academie in Maastricht. He also serves on the board of the American Academy in Rome.

Rock has been in a relationship with Susan Sellers, one of the other founding partners of 2x4, since the late 1980s. The couple have two children and have a home on Block Island.

== Writing ==
In 1996 Rock published The Designer as Author, an influential essay examining the ideas of authorship, agency, and style in the context of graphic design.

Rock is the editor and co-author of Multiple Signatures: On Designers, Authors, Readers and Users (New York: Rizzoli, 2013, ISBN 978-0847839735), a collection of interviews and essays covering topics related to graphic design, visual culture, and projects Rock designed at 2x4. The book includes contributions by Rem Koolhaas, Iwan Baan, Rick Poynor, Jan Van Toorn, Paul Elliman, Jean-François Lyotard, and Michael Speaks.

He is frequent contributor to publications including The New York Times and Eye.

== Recognition ==
Rock is the recipient of the 1999 Rome Prize in Design, and in 2006, was awarded the National Design Award.

As winner of the National Design Award, Rock was invited with other winners to the White House. Rock gained notoriety as one of the signers of a letter to the White House declining the invitation. Also signing the letter were co-winners Susan Sellers, Georgianna Stout, Paula Scher, and Stefan Sagmeister.
