= Catherine Ingraham =

Professor of Architecture in New York City

Catherine Ingraham is a professor of architecture in the graduate architecture program at Pratt Institute in New York City, a program for which she was chair from 1999 to 2005.

== Biography ==
Ingraham is the daughter of Elizabeth Wright Ingraham and Gordon Ingraham. She was raised in Colorado and earned her doctorate at Johns Hopkins University. Ingraham held academic appointments at the University of Illinois at Chicago and Iowa State University and was a visiting professor at Princeton University, the Harvard Graduate School of Design, and Columbia University, before joining Pratt as chair of the graduate architecture program in 1999.

She is married, with one son, and is one of eight great-granddaughters of Frank Lloyd Wright.

== Publications and editing ==
Ingraham is the author of Architecture, Animal, Human: The Asymmetrical Condition (Routledge 2006), Architecture and the Burdens of Linearity (Yale University Press 1998), and Architecture’s Theory (MIT Press 2023). She was co-editor of Restructuring Architectural Theory (Northwestern University Press 1986). From 1991 to 1998, Ingraham was an editor, with Michael Hays and Alicia Kennedy, of Assemblage: A Critical Journal of Architecture and Design Culture. Dr. Ingraham has published extensively in academic journals and book collections and lectured at architecture schools nationally and internationally. Throughout her career, she has organized and participated in symposia that advance serious discussions about architecture; in February 2008, she ran a conference at Columbia University on animate life and form entitled "Part Animal."

== Design ==
In 2001, Ingraham was the winner, with architect Laurie Hawkinson, of a design competition and building commission for the Museum of Women's History in New York.
