= David Weeks (designer) =

American designer (born 1968)

- Born: 30 December 1968 (age 57)
- Occupation: Designer

David Weeks (born October 30, 1968) is an American designer of lighting, furniture, and household products.

== Early life ==
Originally from Athens, Georgia, Weeks studied painting and sculpture at the Rhode Island School of Design, where he earned a BFA. He then worked in the Manhattan studio of Ted Muehling before founding David Weeks Studio. Additionally, Weeks served as an adjunct professor at Parsons School of Design from 1998-2006, and in 2002 he was a visiting critic at Yale.

== David Weeks Studio ==
Weeks established the New York-based David Weeks Studio in 1996. The studio specializes in producing lighting and furniture for both commercial and residential purposes. Its product lines include Sculpt, an upholstered collection; Sarus, a lighting collection for Ralph Pucci; updated Semana chairs for Habitat UK; and new consumer products for Areaware and Kikkerland.

The Studio also designs custom lighting, furniture, sculpture, and interiors. Its commissioned projects include work for clients such as Barneys New York, Kate Spade, Saks Fifth Avenue, MGM Grand Las Vegas, Hard Rock Hotel Las Vegas, and Bliss Spa.

David Weeks Studio lighting is featured in the apartment of Serena van der Woodsen, a character in the TV series Gossip Girl, as well as the 2007 film Interview.

== Awards and exhibitions ==
In 2007, Weeks was nominated for the Cooper Hewitt National Design Award for the second time. In April 2006, he made his second appearance in the Metropolitan Home Design 100. In 2005, he was invited to judge I.D. Magazine’s Annual Design Review, and in 2004, he was one of seven designers chosen to represent New York at Berlin’s 7+7 Designmai exhibit. Weeks was featured in the 2003 Cooper-Hewitt’s National Design Triennial: Inside Design Now.

Weeks won Editor Awards at the 1999 and 2001 International Contemporary Furniture Fair. Butter's debut collection earned accolades including an award from Blueprint (an architecture magazine) at London’s 100% Design Show, and featured the Lunette lampshade.

- 2010 Nominee, Designpreis Deutschland
- 2009 GOOD DESIGN Award, Hanno & Ursa Wooden Toys
- 2008 GOOD DESIGN Award, Sculpt furniture & Sarus lighting collection
- 2006 Metropolitan Home Design 100
- 2005 Judge for I.D. Annual Design review
- 2004 Metropolitan Home Design 100
- 2001 Editors Award, ICFF, Lighting (as Butter)
- 1999 Award Annual Design Review ID Magazine, Lunette
- 1999 Editors Award, ICFF, Lighting

== Publications ==
Weeks's work has been featured in such publications as Dwell, Architectural Digest, Interior Design, Harper’s Bazaar, Wallpaper*, W, I.D., and Elle Decor. His work has also been featured in the following books:

- Overs!ze: Mega Art & Installations, 2013 Victionary
- Toy Design, 2010 Braun Publishing
- Creative USA, 2008 daab books
- Ultimate New York Design, 2006 teNeues Vertag GmbH + Co. KG, Kemper
- Young Designers Americas, 2006 daab, Fusion Publishing
- Inside Design Now, 2003 Princeton Architectural Press

== Additional sources ==
- A Country House, Cookie magazine, September 2008
- Workspace: David Weeks, Dunderdon Website, September 2008
- Designer Identikit, Azure Magazine, August 2008
- A New Line of Upholstered Furniture, New York Times, March 20, 2008
- Best in Show at WestWeek, Los Angeles Times, March 2008
- Are Designers Sheathing the Cutting Edge?, New York Times, May 19, 2005
- Personal shopper: Summertime, and the Lighting Is Breezy, New York Times, June 10, 2004
- Currents: Trade Show; A Little Modern, At the Javits Center, New York Times, May 15, 2003
- Q+A with David Weeks & Lindsay Adelman, I.D. (magazine)
- Design notebook: Designers Find You Can't Live On Buzz, New York Times, September 21, 2000
- Currents: Lighting; Good Company For Book Lovers To Greet the New Year, New York Times, December 23, 1999
