= Sanford Kwinter =

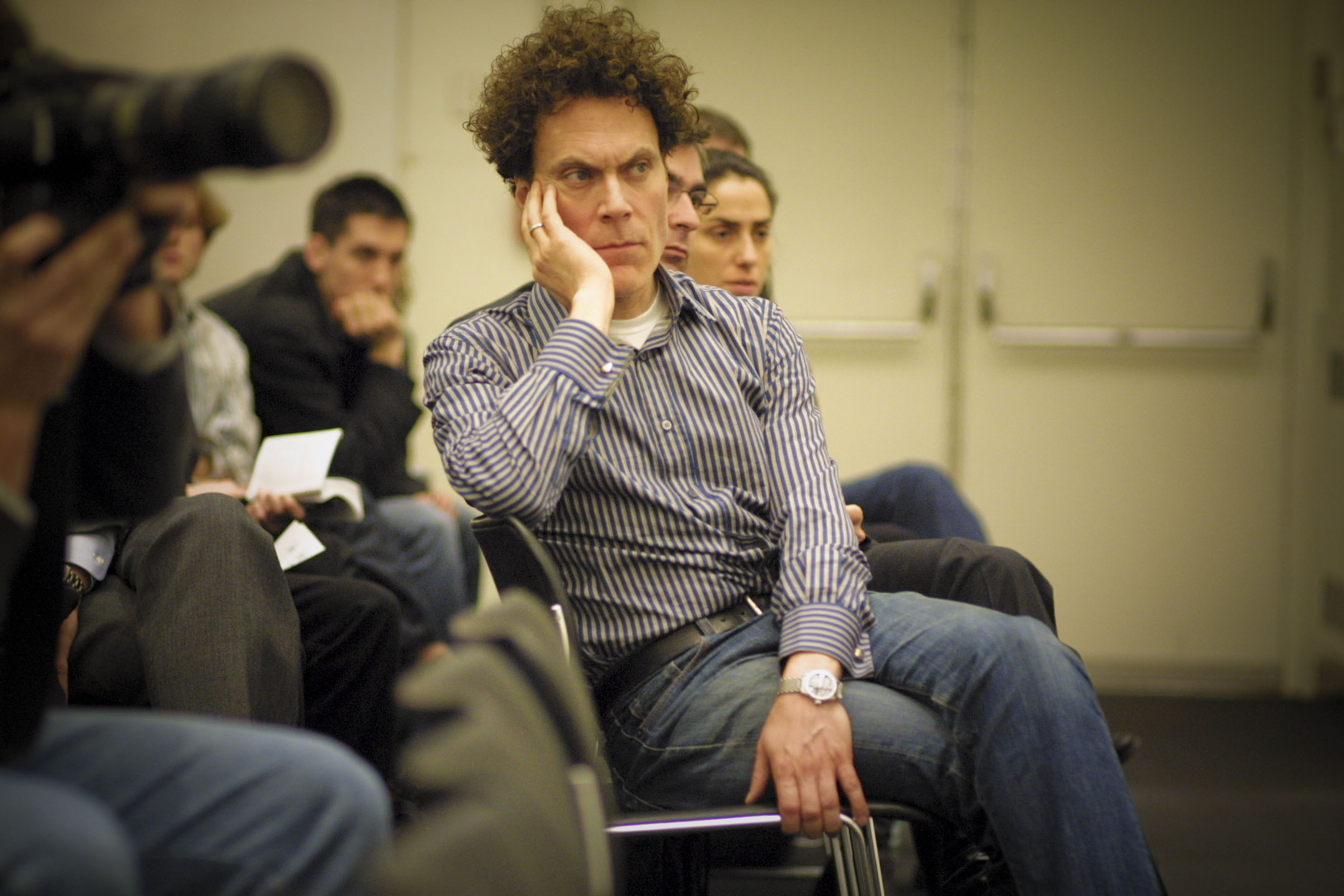
- Education: Columbia University

Sanford Kwinter is a Canadian-born, New York–based writer and architectural theorist, and a co-founder of Zone Books publishers. Kwinter currently serves as Professor of Theory and Criticism at the Pratt Institute. He formerly served as an associate professor at Rice University in Houston, Texas, and has also taught at MIT, Columbia University and Cornell University and Rensselaer Polytechnic Institute and at Harvard University Graduate School of Design.

Having received a doctorate in comparative literature from Columbia University, Kwinter lectured at Harvard University, the University of Applied Arts Vienna (Universität für angewandte Kunst Wien), the Berlage Institute in Rotterdam, the Architectural Association in London and the Städelschule in Frankfurt. Over the past twenty years, his publications have pioneered new ideas in art, architecture, science and the humanities. He has written widely on philosophical issues related to design, architecture, and urbanism, and was involved in the series of conferences and publications convened by ANY magazine between 1991 and 2000.

== Books ==
- ZONE 1/2: The Contemporary City (1986) MIT Press.
- ZONE 6: Incorporations (1992) MIT Press.
- Architectures of Time: Toward a Theory of the Event in Modernist Culture (2001) MIT Press. ISBN 0-262-61181-3
- Far from Equilibrium: Essays on Technology and Design Culture (2008) Actar Press. ISBN 84-96540-64-2
- Requiem: For the City at the End of the Millennium (2010) Actar Press. ISBN 978-84-92861-20-0
