= 2A Continental Architectural Awards =

- Native name: 2ACAA
- Description: Honoring architectural contributions across various continents
- Country: International
- Presented by: 2A Magazine

The 2A Continental Architectural Awards is an architecture award organized by 2A Magazine to recognize and honor an individual or a group’s contribution to the world of architecture.

== Award categories ==
The award is presented under eight categories:

- Residential
- Commercial (Office & Business, Retail and Wholesale Production)
- Public (Sport & Leisure, Education, Hospitality, Culture, Mixed Use, Health)
- Religion, Civic, Transportation, and community-based projects
- Urban Projects, Rural Projects, Landscape & Public Spaces (including squares and streets)
- Old and New (Reuse and adaptation, Renovation, Restoration, Regeneration)
- Interior Architecture
- Future Projects / Innovative Designs

== History ==
=== 2015 ===
The first award event was held in Istanbul, Turkey, with the Istanbul Technical University being the main academic partner. The other technical partners were UNESCO, Istanbul Bilgi University and Research Institute of Cultural Heritage and Tourism of Iran. The event's theme was "The Emergence of Contemporary Architecture in Asia." The jury members consisted of Sinan Mert Sener, Seung H-Sang, Romi Khosla, and Yavuz Selim Sepin.

=== 2016 ===
The second 2A Continental Architectural Award event was held at Vienna, Austria in association with Academy of Fine Arts Vienna. This year's theme was "Innovative Architecture in Asia." The jury consisted of architects including Volkwin Marg, Nasrine Seraji, Wolfgang Tschapeller, Murat Tabanlıoğlu, Françoise Fromonot and Hiromi Hosoya.

The Iranian winners were Moein Jalali, Hooman Balazadeh, Sara kalantari, Ehsan Hosseini & Elham Geramizadeh, Wael Al Awar, DCA, Cui kai + Wang Ke Yao, Hamid Mirmiran, Kazuhiro Kojima, and Wolf D. Prix.

=== 2017 ===
The 2017 2A Awards event took place in Berlin, Germany, and was themed "Innovative Architecture in Various Continents." Seated on the jury were architects Ulrike Lauber, Hubert Neinhoff, and Sergei Tchoban.

=== 2018 ===
The awards ceremony was held at the Institute for Advanced Architecture of Catalonia with the theme "Innovative Contextual Architecture in Asia and Europe". The jury was composed of Carme Pinós, Yoko Okuyama, Abbas Gharib, Willy Müller and Ali Basbous.

The Iranian winners were Moein Jalali, Reza Mafakher, Guillermo Vázquez Consuegra, Wolf D.Prix, Yawar Jilani & Mahboob Khan, Paloma Baquero Masats & Juan Serrano Garcia, and Bruno Rechner.

=== 2019 ===
The awards event for Asia-Oceania, Europe, Africa, South Central, and North America was held at the Polytechnic University of Madrid under the theme "Innovative Contextual Architecture in the Continents".

=== 2020 ===
The award was organised online due to the COVID-19 pandemic. Jury members included Bahram Shirdel, Silja Tillner, Donald Bates, Antoine Guiraud and Asako Yamamoto.

== Administration ==
Ahmad Zohadi is the founder, organizer and director of 2A Continental Architectural Awards, organised since 2015. He is the CEO and editor-in-chief of 2A Magazine, and the founder and chief editor of Architecture & Construction, a quarterly Persian magazine, published since 2003, and distributed in Iran.
