= Pierre Debeaux =

French architect (1925–2001)

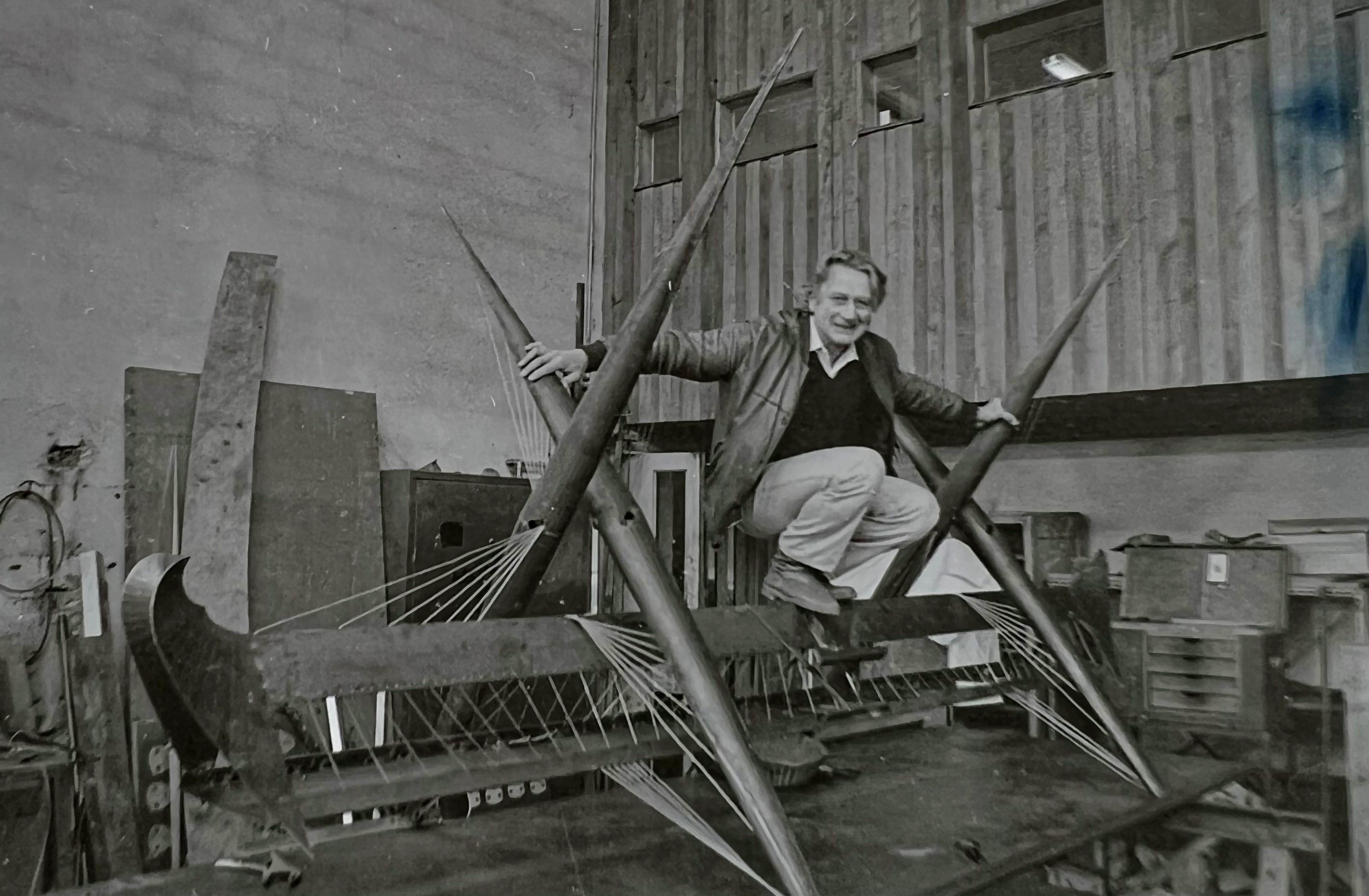
- Debeaux perched on a scale model of his Angers footbridge (1982)
- Born: Pierre Amédée Bernard Debeaux; 19 July 1925; Mazères-sur-Salat, France
- Died: 22 January 2001 (aged 75); Toulouse, Haute-Garonne, France
- Occupation: Architect
- Buildings: Jacques Vion fire station; Monument to the Glory of the Resistance; Pradier house
- Projects: Pic du Midi de Bigorre

Signature
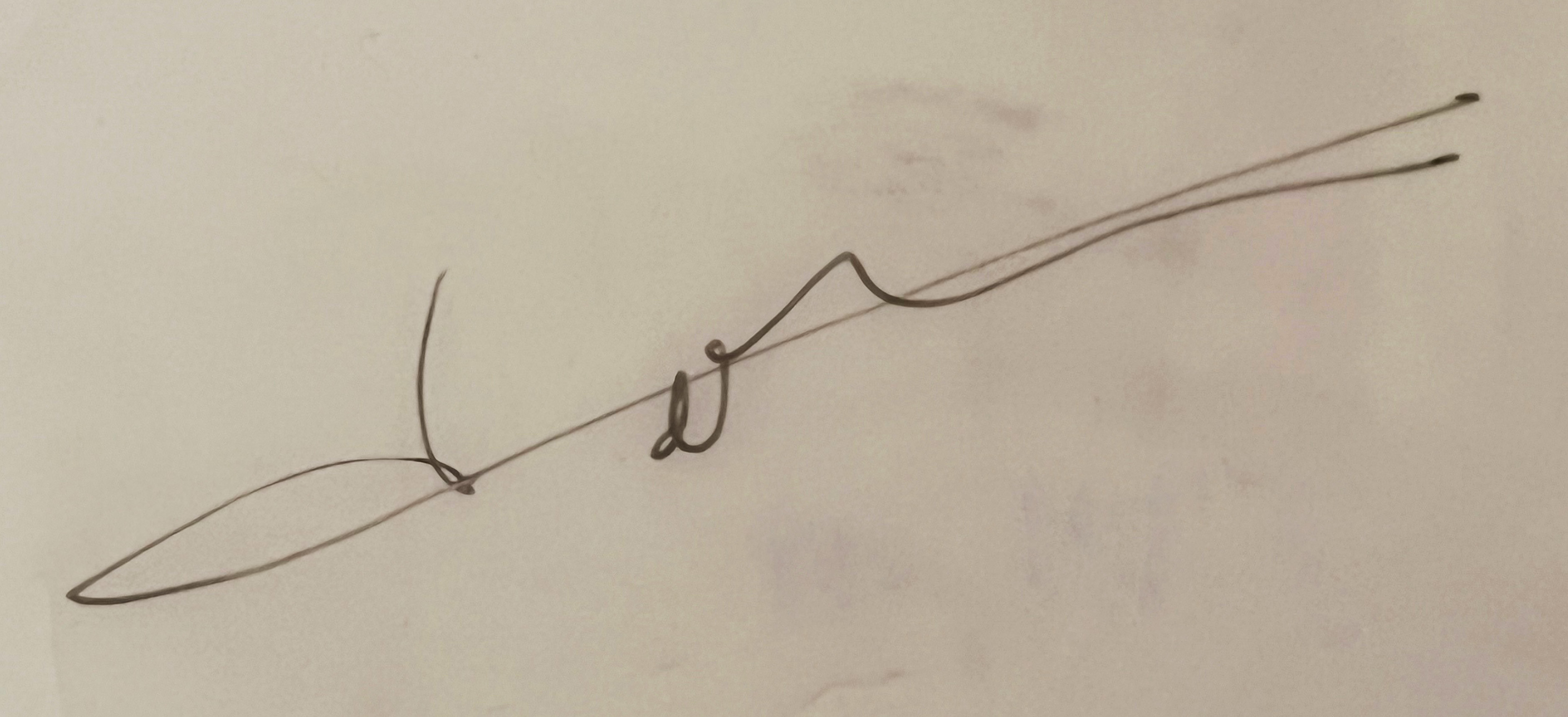

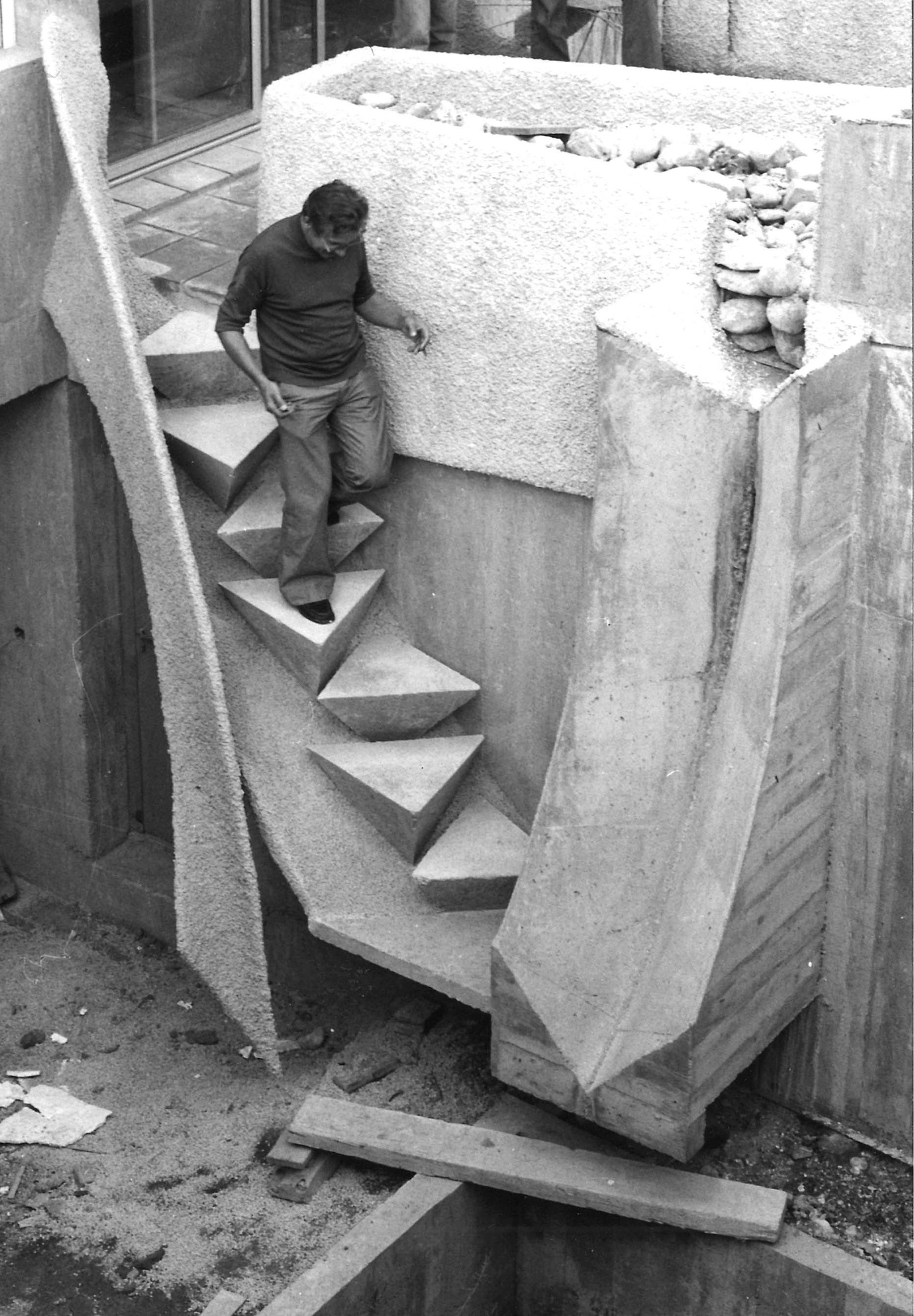
Pierre Debeaux at Villa Pradier (1978)

Pierre Debeaux (19 July 1925 – 22 January 2001) was a French modernist architect and polymath. He is known for buildings such as the observatory of the Pic du Midi de Bigorre, the Jacques Vion fire station and the Monument to the Glory of the Resistance in Toulouse, and the Pradier house in the Tarn, all of which are registered French national landmarks. He is described in the archives of the Haute-Garonne as "the most inventive architect of his generation".

== Early life an education ==
Pierre Amédée Bernard Debeaux was born on July 19, 1925, in Mazères-sur-Salat. His father, François Jean Bernard Debeaux (1901–1984) was an electrical engineer who taught industrial design at both the Ecole des Beaux-arts and the Lycée Pierre-de-Fermat in Toulouse. The Debeaux family lived in Toulouse and had a second home in Saint-Denis-les-Martel in the Lot.

He attended the Lycée Pierre-de-Fermat in Toulouse from 1935–1943 and graduated with a baccalaureate in mathematics, followed by a baccalaureate in philosophy under the tutelage of Jean-Pierre Vernant. He remained a fervent admirer of Vernant's Hellenism throughout his life, and was also influenced by Vernant's involvement in the Resistance.

Debeaux obtained a degree in architecture from the Ecole Nationale Supérieure des Beaux-Arts in June 1950 with a project for an agricultural tool forge. He was awarded the prize for the best national diploma and became a registered architect in 1950.

During the 1960s and 1970s, he embarked on several major research trips to discover different cultures and heritages: Siberia and China (1966); Ecuador, Peru, Colombia, Brazil and Bolivia (1967 and 1971); India, Nepal and Kashmir (1968); Mexico (1969); Siberia and Japan (1970); Indonesia and Sri Lanka (1972); and Turkey (1974). These journeys added an Orientalist influence to Debeaux's work.

== Work and career ==
From 1954 to 1972, Debeaux was part of the "Atelier des Architectes Associés", which he co-founded. He devoted much of his time to research into harmonic relationships and three-dimensional structures. Between 1966 and 1989, he filed a series of patents in France, Europe and the United States for three-dimensional structures.

He is known for buildings such as the observatory of the Pic du Midi de Bigorre, built between 1951–1966 (Debeaux was only 26 when he began the project); the Jacques Vion fire station (1966–1972) and the Monument à la Gloire de la Résistance (1965–1971) in Toulouse, and the landmarked Pradier house (1974–1978) in the Tarn. Charlotte Perriand was commissioned to design unique furniture pieces for the Pradier house. These pieces were sold at Sotheby's in 2020.

In 1958 Debeaux became a professor at the Ecole des Beaux-arts in Toulouse.

In 1973 he was awarded the Charles-Henri Besnard prize for the innovative metal roof structure design of the Jacques Vion fire station.

In 1981, he won the Académie d'Architecture's "Beau Béton" competition for the Pradier house.

Debeaux made artistic and scientific contributions to the Musée des Augustins in Toulouse between 1965 and 1992.

== Personal life ==
Pierre Debeaux and his partner Elisabeth Cardo had one daughter, Charlotte, born in Toulouse in 1985.

== Death and legacy ==
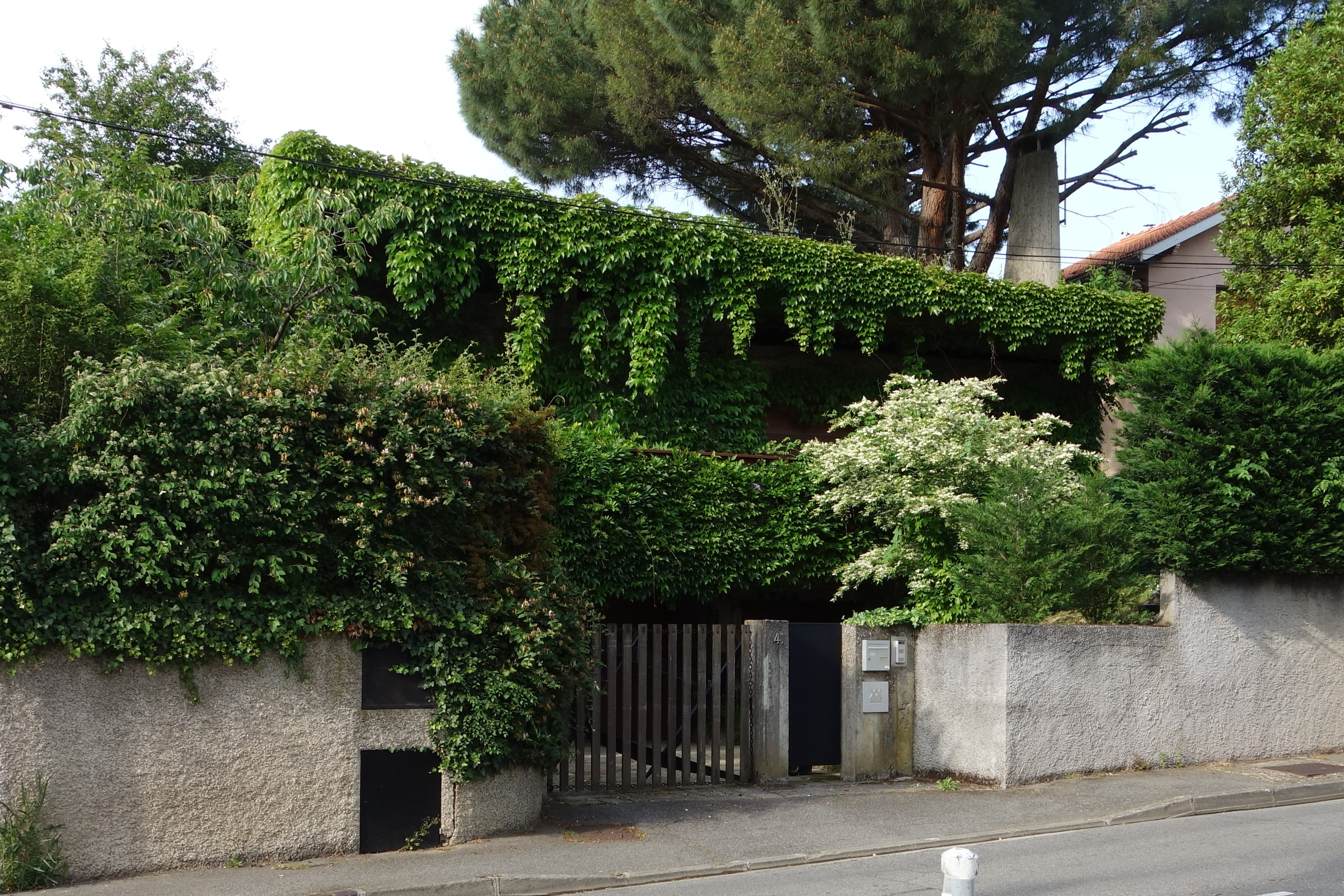
Villa Chanfreau, Toulouse (pictured in 2023)

Debeaux suffered a stroke in November 1997. He died in Toulouse in January 2001.

Debeaux's Pradier house and Monument to the Glory of the Resistance are protected French national landmarks. An initiative was begun in 2023 to add the Jacques Vion fire station to the French register of protected monuments resulting in the building being granted protected status.

== Partial list of works ==
- 1956 Citroën building (with Atelier des Architectes Associés) (Note: Architecture Contemporaine Remarquable (Label ACR) [Outstanding Contemporary Architecture])
- 1956 Extension of groupe scolaire Jules Julien (with Roger Brunerie)
- 1956 Groupe scolaire Molière, Saint Cyprien, Toulouse (with Roger Brunerie)
- 1956 Primary school, Jolimont, Toulouse (with Roger Brunerie) (Note: Bâtiments du XXe en Midi toulousain (Bâtiments remarquables listés dans l’inventaire de la DRAC) [20th c. Architecture in Midi-Toulouse])
- 1956 Primary school, Sept Deniers, Toulouse (with Roger Brunerie)
- 1957 Fabre kindergarten, Toulouse
- 1959 Martin house, Engomer
- 1961 Martin house, Castelnaudary
- 1961 Recherche Institute, Bagnère de Bigorre
- 1963 Water tower, route d'Espagne
- 1969 Villa Chanfreau, Cote Pavée, Toulouse
- 1971 Monument to the Glory of the Resistance, Toulouse (with Atelier des Architectes Associés) (Note: Protégée au titre des Monument Historiques (MH) [Protected Historic Monument])
- 1975 Observatory, Pic du Midi de Bigorre
- 1967 Jacques Vion fire station, Toulouse
- 1969 Vessières apartment building, Toulouse
- 1970 Pham Huu Chan house, Clermont-le-Fort
- 1977 Pradier house, Lavaur

== Gallery ==
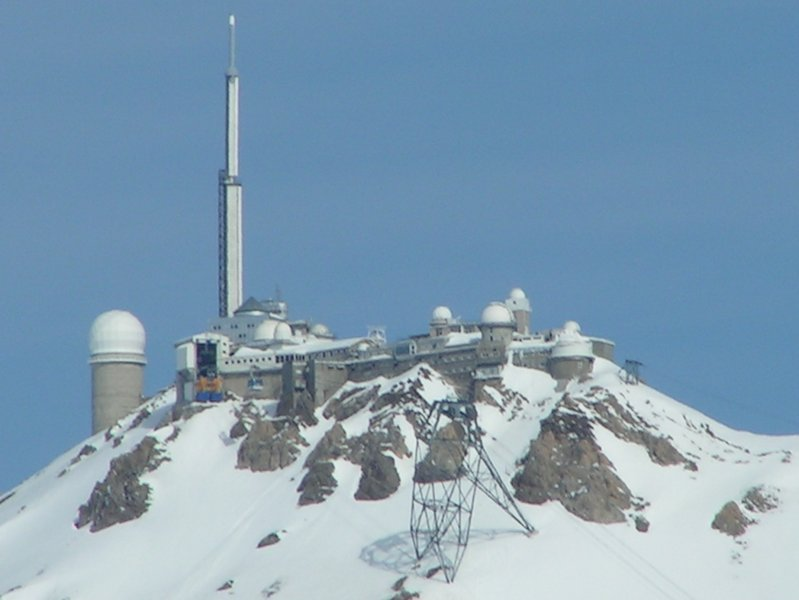
Pic du Midi de Bigorre observatory

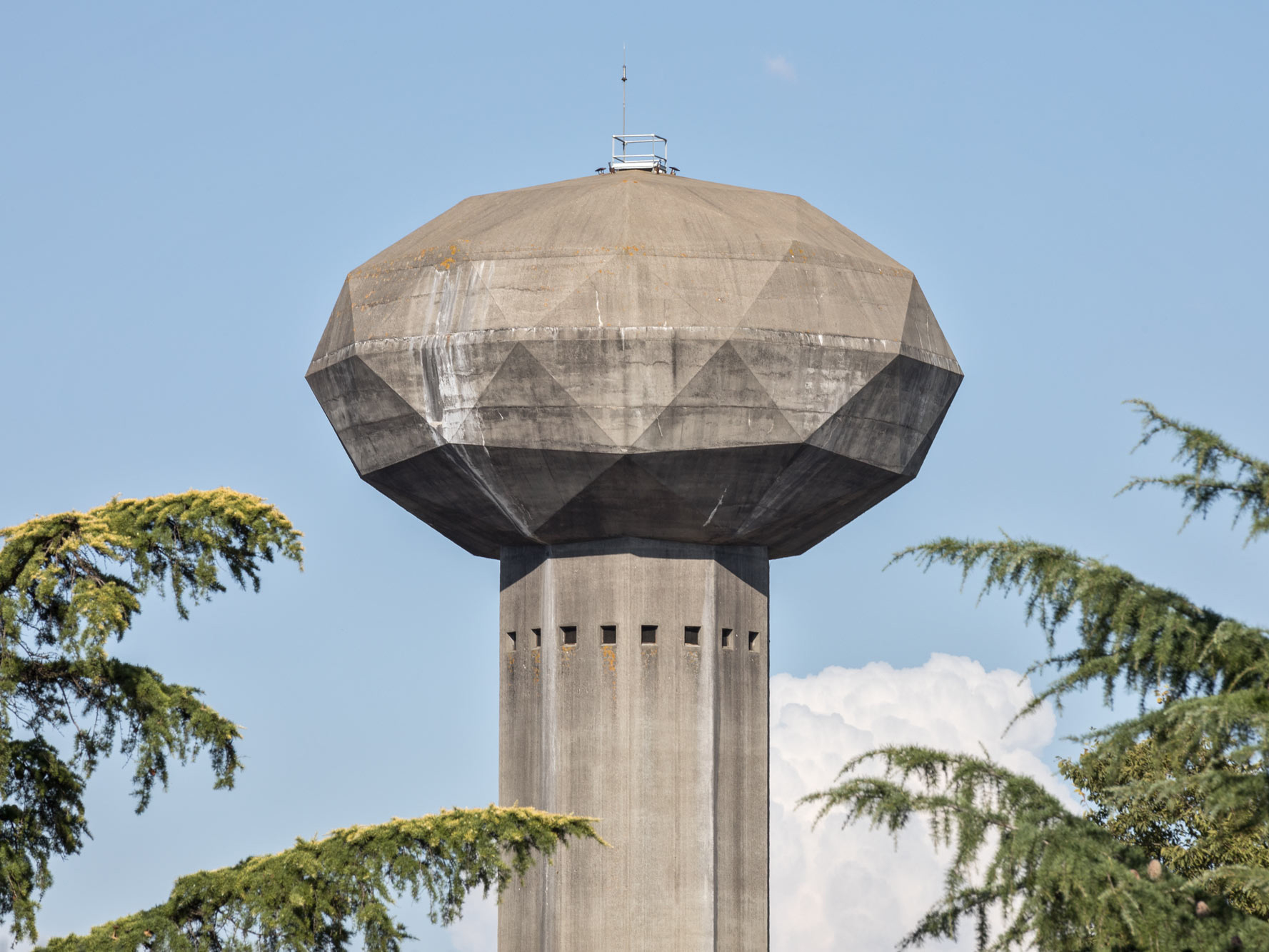
Water tower (Chateau d'eau) of the Marchant Hospital

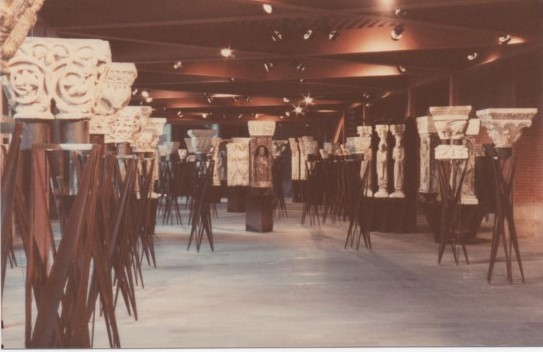
Musée des Augustins

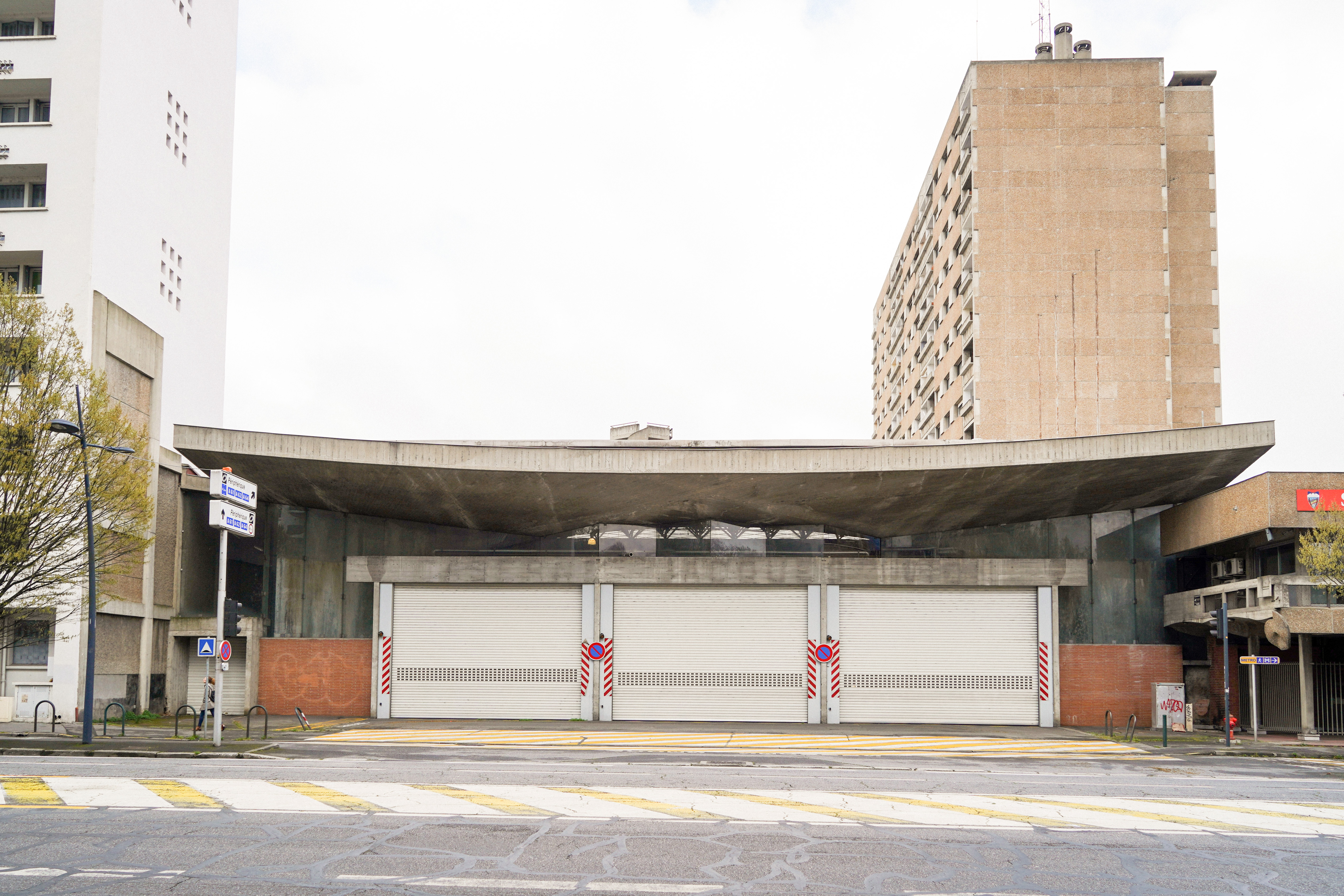
Jacques Vion fire station, principal façade (grande halle)

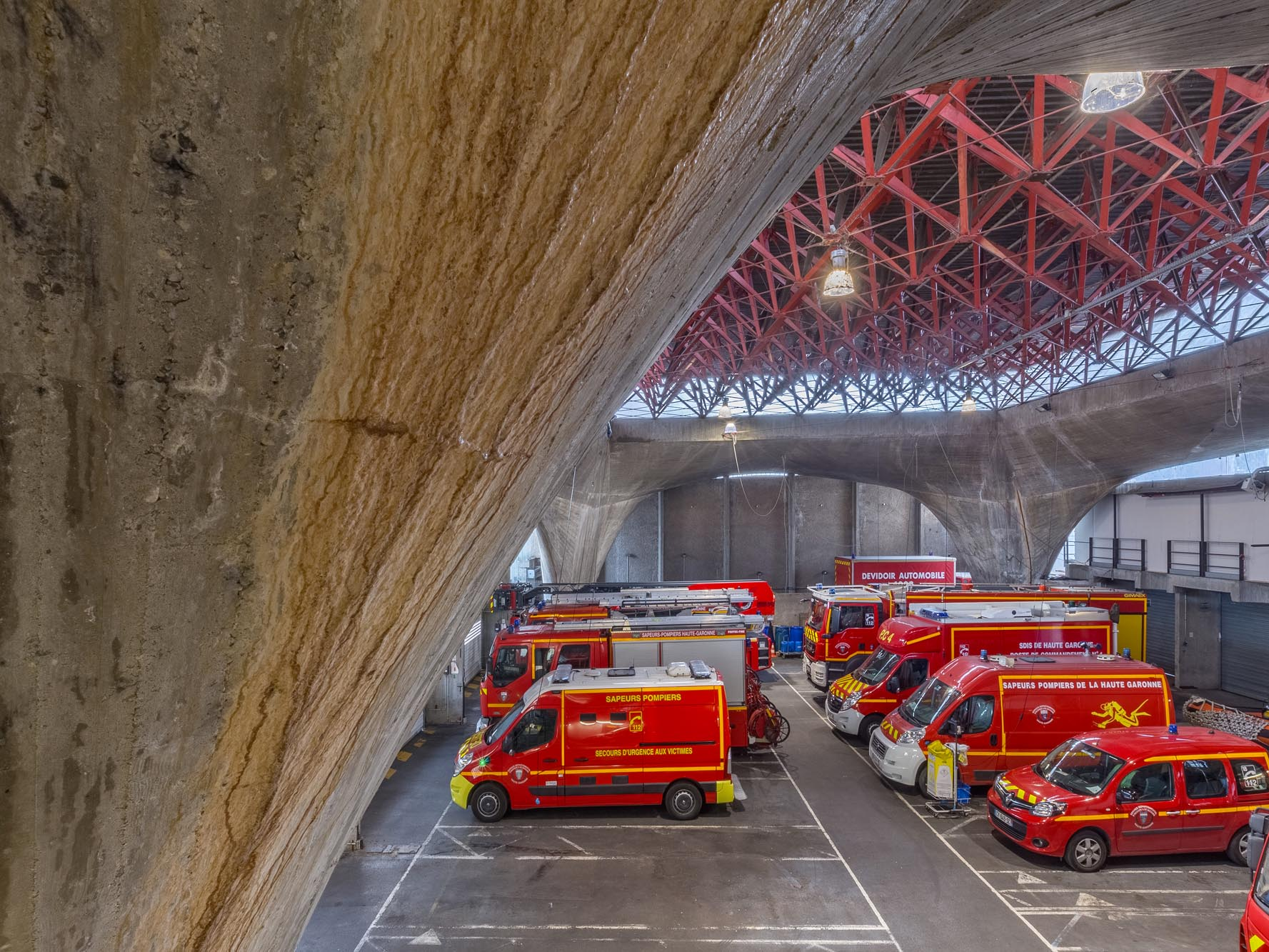
Jacques Vion fire station, (grande halle)

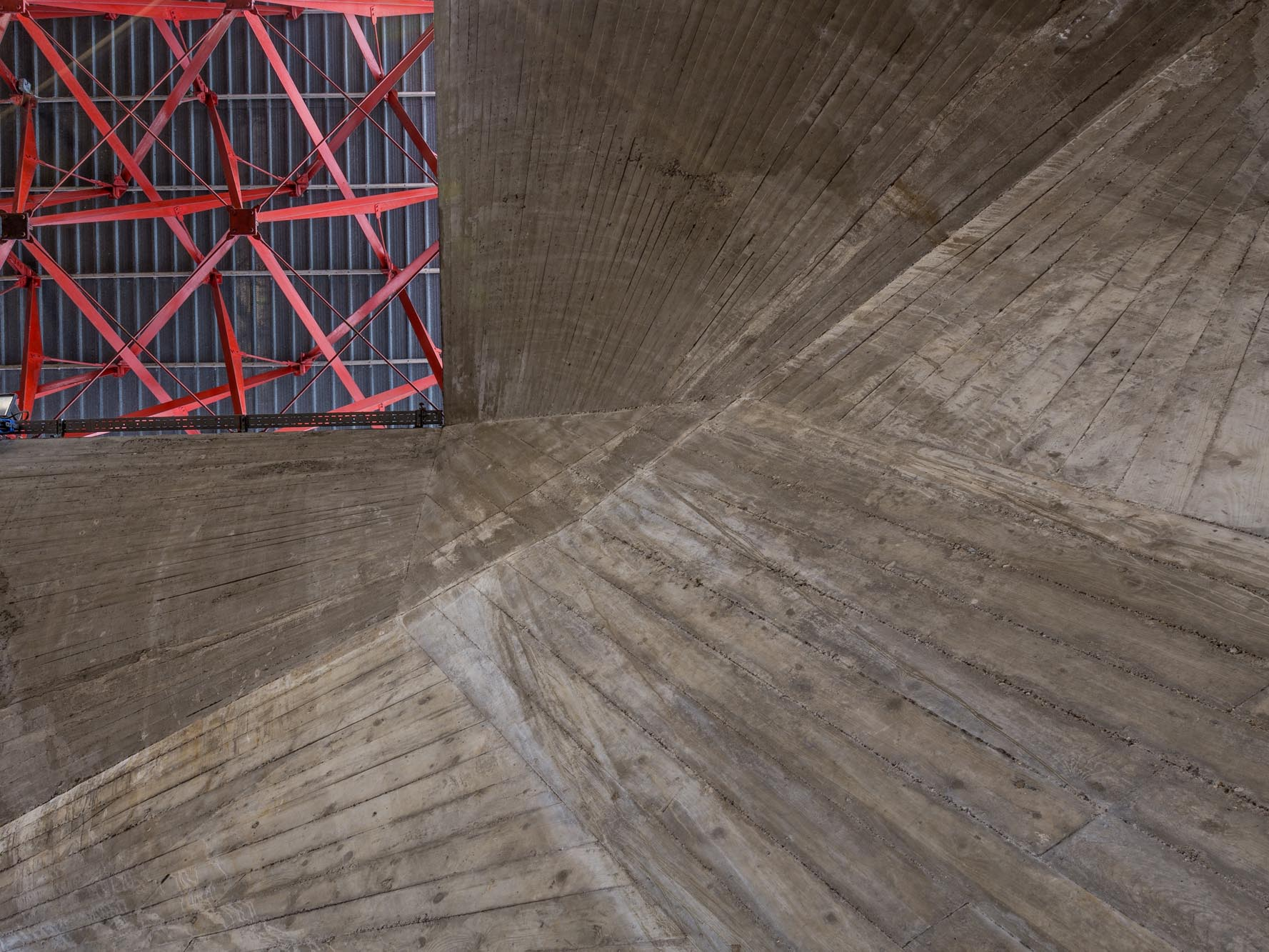
Jacques Vion fire station, structural details (grande halle)

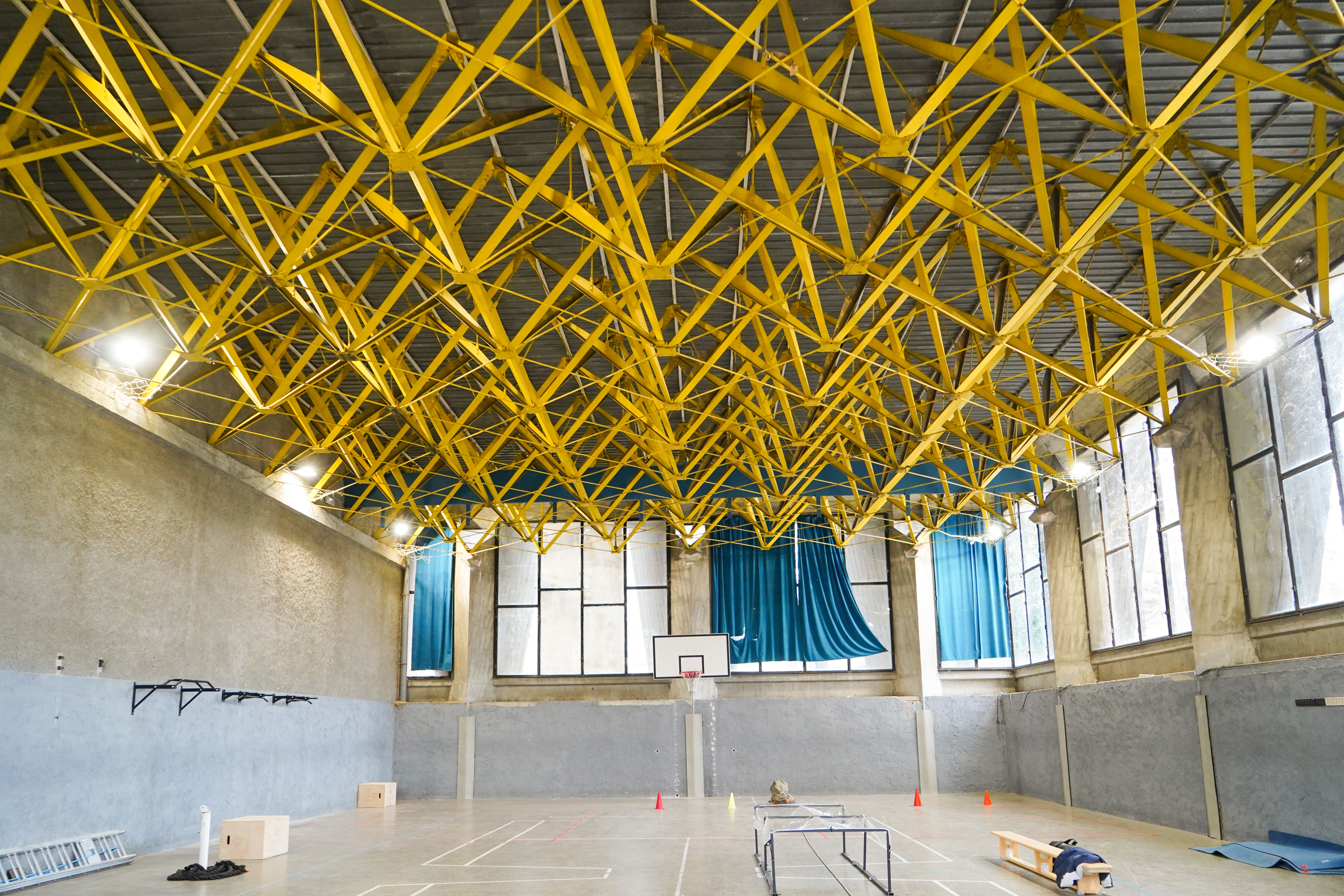
Jacques Vion fire station, gymnasium

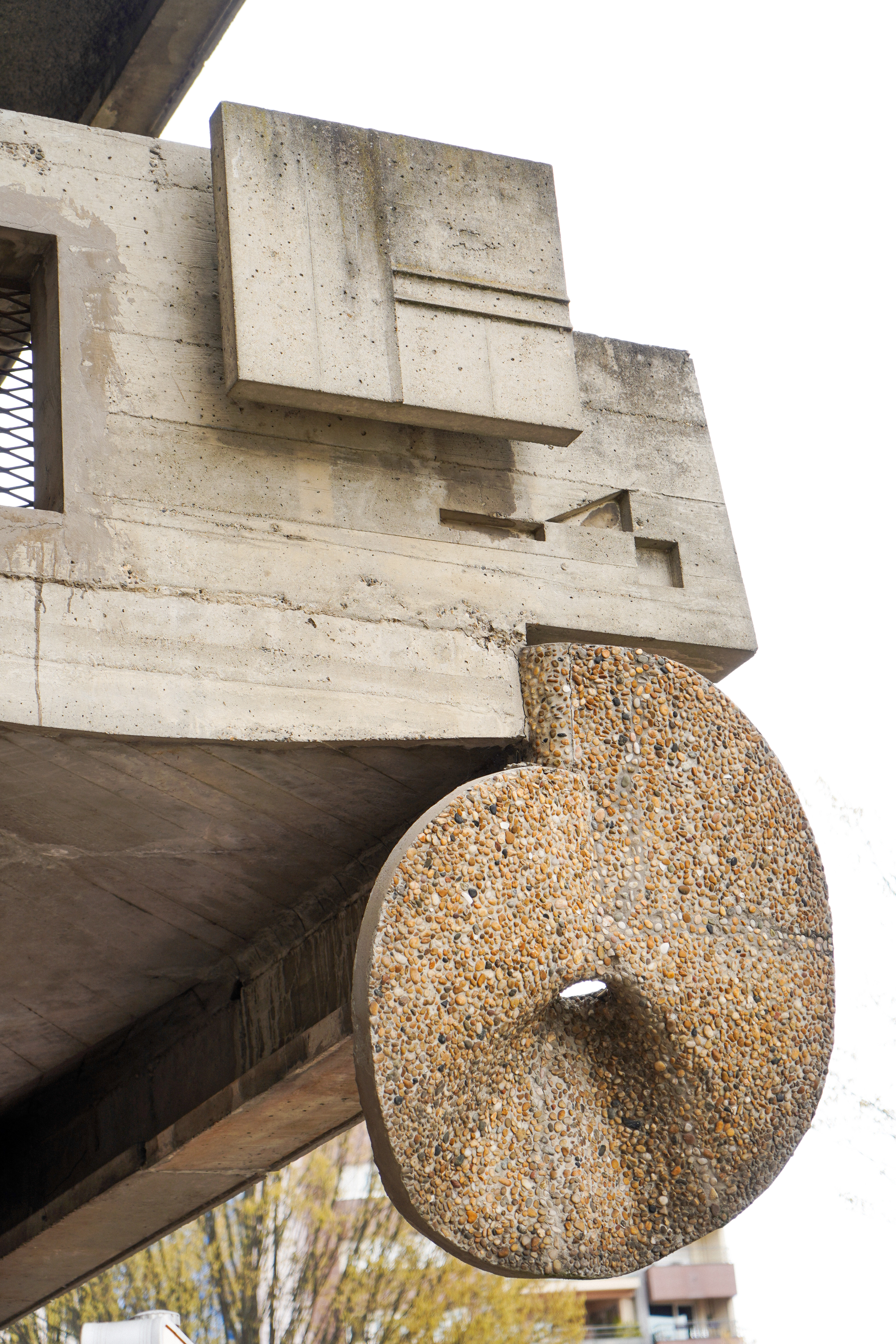
Jacques Vion firestation, balcony detail

== Publications ==
- Gruet, Stéphane (2005). Éditions POÏESIS (ed.). Pierre Debeaux, architecte (1955–2001): L'artiste et le géomètre. Poïésis-AERA. p. 104. ISBN 978-2951895317.
- Marfaing, Jean-Loup; Papillault, Rémi (2013). Presses Universitaires du Mirail (ed.). Du moderne au brutalisme, 13 villas à l'épreuve du temps. Presses universitaires du Mirail. p. 167. ISBN 978-2-8107-0268-8.
- Saint-Pierre, Raphaëlle (2013). Norma, Renne (ed.). Villas 60–70 en France. Norma Éd. p. 320. ISBN 978-2-9155-4242-4.
