= Nasrine Seraji =

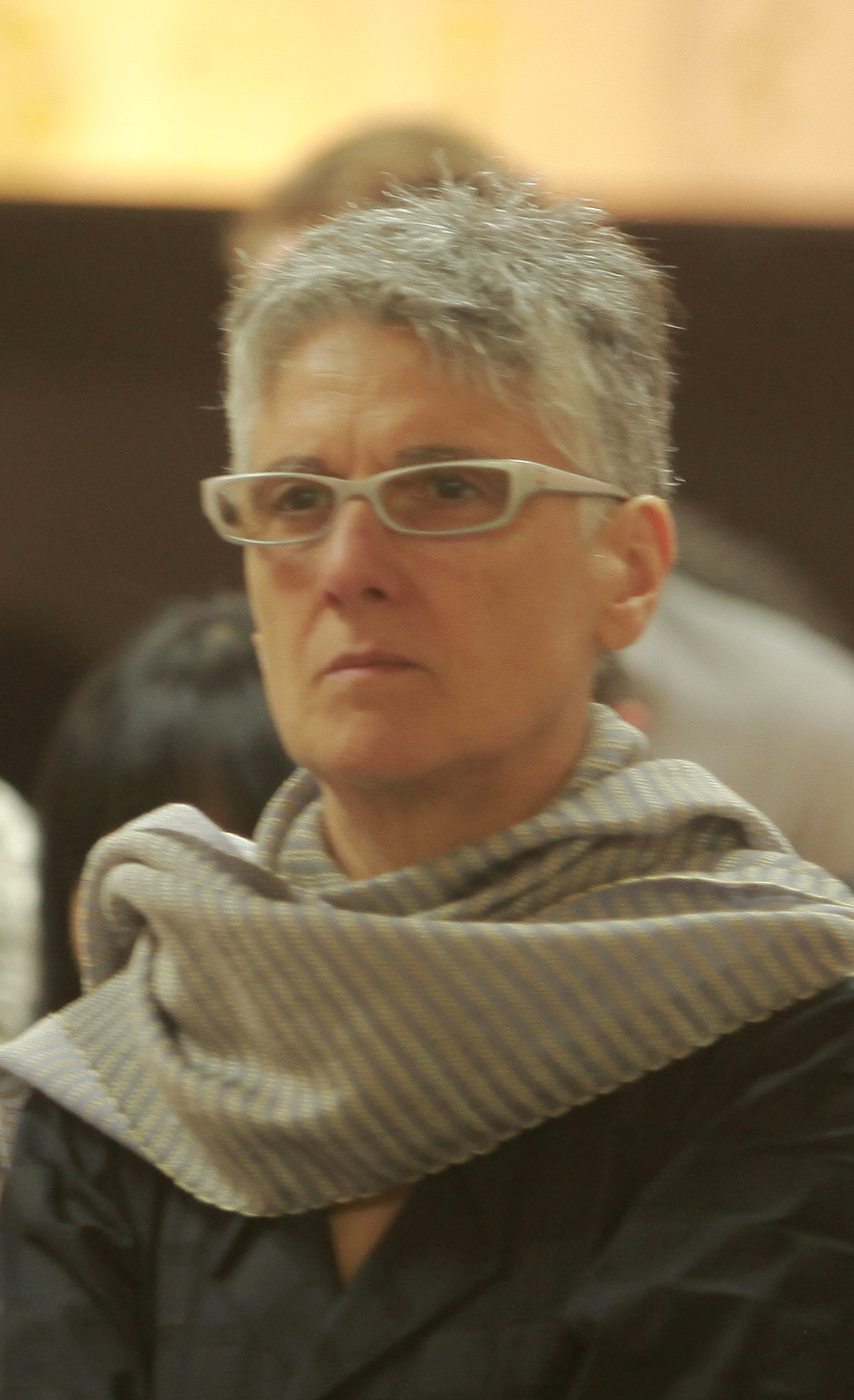
- Born: Nasrin Seraji-Bozorgzad; Tehran, Iran
- Education: Architectural Association School of Architecture, London
- Occupation: Architect
- Practice: Atelier Seraji Architectes & Associes (ASAA) New Speculations on Architecture (NSA) New Agency for Speculative Architecture (NASA)
- Buildings: BIG HEAVY BEAUTIFUL Paris 14
- Projects: Temporary American Centre, Paris (1991) Lille School of Architecture extension, Lille (2006) Big Heavy Beautiful, Paris (2017)
- Website: http://www.seraji.net

Nasrine Seraji-Bozorgzad AA Dipl FRIBA, is an Iranian-born French-British architect. She is a 2011 recipient of the Knight of the Legion of Honour, an Officier of l'Ordre national du Mérite and l'Ordre des Arts et des Lettres.

== Early life ==
Seraji was born in Tehran, Iran.

== Career ==
After studying at the Architectural Association and practising in London, Seraji moved to Paris in 1989 to establish her studio where architecture is treated as both a cultural debate and a practice. Since then, she has pursued a path constantly enriched by her simultaneous engagement in architectural practice, teaching, and research. She has lectured and exhibited her work widely in Europe, North America, China, and South East Asia.

=== Academic ===
Between 1993 and 2001, Seraji taught at Columbia University GSAPP in New York, at the Architectural Association in London as Diploma Unit Master, and Princeton University as Visiting Professor. During this time, she also taught at the Academy of Fine Arts in Vienna where she directed one of the two architecture Master Schools. Seraji was Professor and Chair of the Department of Architecture at Cornell University from 2001 to 2005. In 2006, she became Dean of the École Nationale Supérieure d’Architecture Paris-Malaquais by Presidential decree. That same year, she returned to the Academy of Fine Arts in Vienna where she held the position of Professor of Ecology, Sustainability and Conservation, as well as Head of the Institute for Art and Architecture. She served as the Head of the Department of Architecture at the University of Hong Kong where she was also Professor in Architecture. She is currently Full Professor of Architectural Design at University College Dublin, Visiting Critic at Rice Architecture Paris, and Distinguished Professor of Architectural Design and Research at Michael Graves College of Wenzhou-Kean University.

=== Professional practice ===
Architect of the Temporary American Centre in Paris, Seraji has completed several notable buildings and projects, including apartment buildings in Vienna, student housing in Paris (2003) and an extension to the School of Architecture in Lille (2006), the latter were both nominated for the Mies Van der Rohe Prize in 2005 and 2007 respectively. Seraji was among the Jury members of the second 2A Continental Architectural Award held at Vienna, Austria in 2016. Big Heavy Beautiful, a complex mixed-use building for the Paris Transportation Authority comprising 213 housing units, a crèche, a bus depot and an associative garden was inaugurated in 2017.

== Honours ==
- Seraji has been honoured with the distinction of Chevalier and Officier by the French government on a number of occasions.
- 2006: Chevalier des Arts et des Lettres from the Minister of Culture in France as an architect contributing to excellence in arts and humanities
- 2008: Chevalier de l'Ordre National du Merite by Presidential decree
- 2008: Medaille d'Argent by French Academy of Architecture for her contribution to academic endeavours in architecture
- 2011: Chevalier de l'Ordre National de la Legion d'Honneur (14 July 2011)
- 2016: promoted to Officier de l'Ordre national du Mérite
- 2017: promoted to Officier des Arts et des Lettres
- 2018: elected as Fellow of the Royal Institute of British Architects

== Selected works and publications ==
=== Works ===
- 1991: the Temporary American Centre, rue de Bercy, 12th arrondissement of Paris
- 1995: Master Plan for the site of the gendarmerie barracks Briey (Meurthe-et-Moselle)
- 1996: Cave Dragon, Chemin des Dames (Aisne)
- 1997: Renovation of a bar 50 homes in Sarcelles (Val-d'Oise)
- 2003: 164 student housing units in Paris and 50 in Vienna, Austria
- 2005: extension of the Lille School of Architecture
- 2005: Master Plan of 105 hectares for the Hippodrome site in Penang, Malaysia
- 2006: Master Plan for the city of Le Rheu
- 2007: 107 km^{2} Masterplan for the city of Chongli, China
- 2011: Le Cabanon, student center in Rue de Sophia-Antipolis, 14200 Hérouville-Saint-Clair, France
- 2012: Tehran Stock Exchange Competition, 3rd / Nasrine Seraji + ASAA + Mehdi Bakhshizadeh + Tadbir Omran lranian

=== Publications ===
- Seraji-Bozorgzad, Nasrine. "Chapter 6: Diversion." Edited by Francesca Hughes. The Architect: Reconstructing Her Practice. Cambridge, MA: MIT Press, 1996. pp. 128–147. ISBN 978-0-262-08245-7 OCLC 34113316
- Seraji-Bozorgzad, Nasrine. "The Architecture Model." Edited by Michael Krapf. Triumph der Phantasie: Barocke Modellen von Hildebrandt bis Mollinarolo. 218. Wechselausstellung der Österreichischen Galerie Belvedere. Wien: Böhlau, 1998. ISBN 978-3-205-98958-5 OCLC 467648587
- Seraji, Nasrine. "Nexus-Atelier: Tools, Organization, Process." Edited by Cynthia C. Davidson. Anyhow. New York, NY: Anyone Corp.; Cambridge, MA: MIT Press, 1998. ISBN 978-0-262-54095-7 OCLC 39725982
- Seraji-Bozorgzad, Nasrine, and Françoise Fromonot. Nasrine Seraji: L'Architettura come Territorio = Architecture as Territory. About 6 series. Melfi (Potenza): Libria, 2002. ISBN 978-8-887-20225-0 OCLC 680181233
- Seraji, Nasrine. Logement, Matière De Nos Villes: Chronique Européenne, 1900-2007 = Housing, Substance of Our Cities: European Chronicle, 1900-2007. Paris: A. & J. Picard, 2007. Exhibition catalog of the Arsenal Pavilion, June 2007. ISBN 978-2-708-40795-4 OCLC 470530583
- Seraji, Nasrine, Sony Devabhaktuni, and Xiaoxuan Lu, eds. From Crisis to Crisis : Debates on Why Architecture Criticism Matters Today. Barcelona: ACTAR, 2019. ISBN 978-1948765053, 1948765055 OCLC 1104333432

== See also ==
- List of Iranian women in design
