= Françoise Fromonot =

French architect and architectural critic

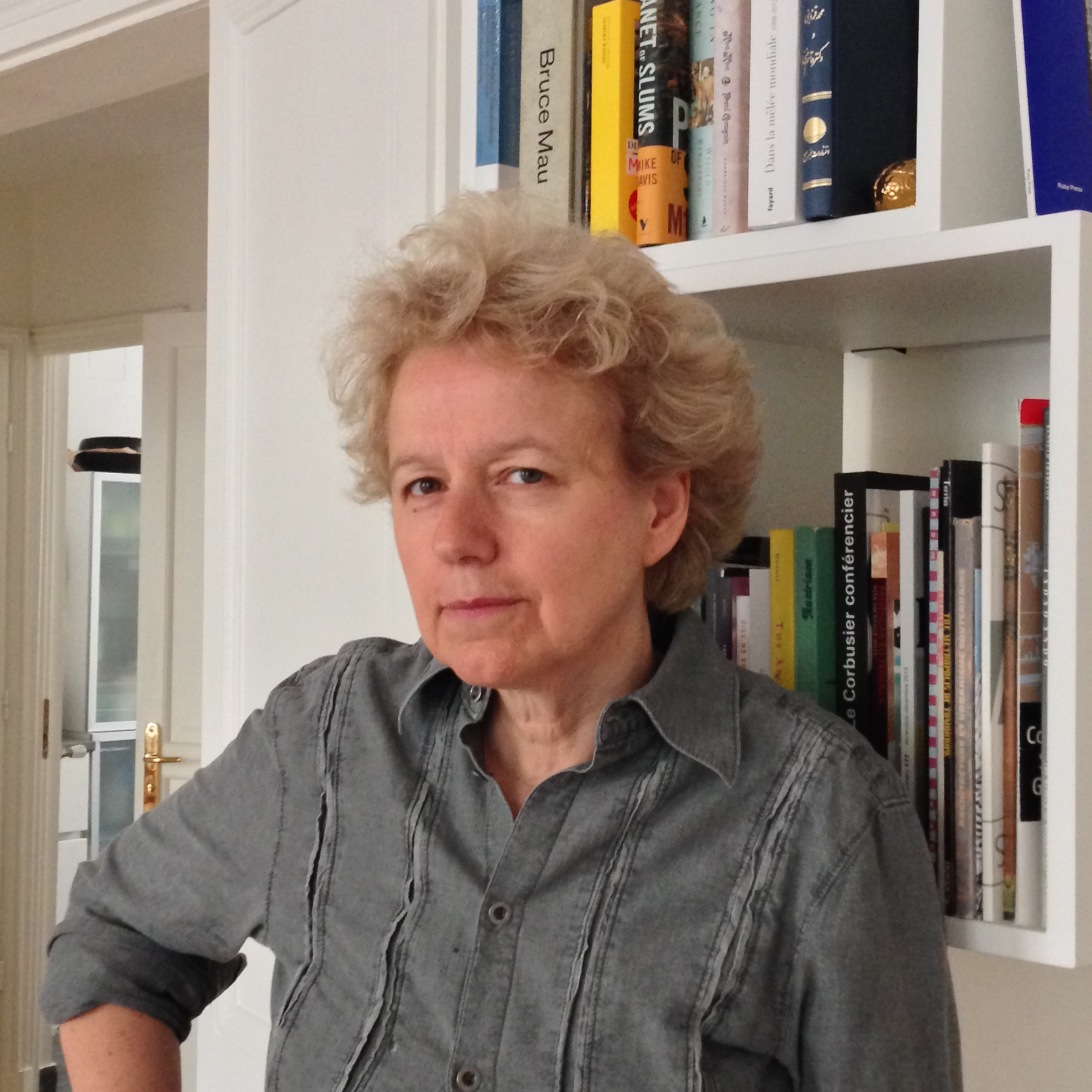
- Born: Paris, France
- Education: École nationale supérieure d'architecture de Paris-La Villette École Nationale Supérieure d'Architecture de Paris-Belleville
- Occupation: Architectural Critic Professor Architect
- Honours: Chevalier des Arts et des Lettres (2020)

Françoise Fromonot (born 1958) is a French architect and architectural critic.

Born in Paris, she qualified as a Architecte diplômé par le gouvernement at the École nationale supérieure d'architecture de Paris-La Villette and received a Diploma of Profound Studies in architectural and urban projects from the École Nationale Supérieure d'Architecture de Paris-Belleville. Fromonot has taught at the University of Technology Sydney, the University of New South Wales, the École Nationale des Ponts et Chaussée, Science-Po Urba (Paris). She is currently Professor of Design, History and Theory at the École Nationale Supérieure d'Architecture de Paris-Belleville and adjunct professor at Rice Architecture Paris.

From 1994 to 1998, she was editor at Architecture d’Aujourd’hui. From 1999 to 2003, she was co-editor-in-chief for the magazine le visiteur. She was also a founding member for the French architectural journal Criticat in 2007. She has contributed to various French and international publications including AMC, Progressive Architecture, Archis, Abitare, Architectural Review, World Architecture, Arquitectura Viva and Casabella.

== Selected publications ==
She has also published several books including:

- Glenn Murcutt, oeuvres et projets (1995)
- Jørn Utzon et l'Opéra de Sydney (1998), received the book prize of the Académie d'architecture
- Sydney, histoire d’un paysage / Sydney, History of a Landscape (with Christopher Thompson), Telleri/Vilo International, Paris, 2000
- Marc Mimram- Passerelle Solférino à Paris, Birkhäuser, Bâle & Berlin, 2001 (bilingual edition french/english)
- Nasrine Seraji-Architecture as Territory (bilingual edition Italian/English), Libria, Melfi, 2002
- Glenn Murcutt–1962-2002, Electa, Milan, 2002. (Gallimard, Paris, 2003 / Thames & Hudson, Londres, 2003), received the book prize of the Académie d'architecture
- La Campagne des Halles - Les nouveaux malheurs de Paris, éditions La Fabrique, Paris, 2005
- Yours critically: Writings on Architecture from criticat issues 1-10 (with Pierre Chabard et Valéry Didelon), criticat, 2016
- La Comédie des Halles - Intrigue et mise en scène, La Fabrique, 2019.
- Michel Desvigne Paysagiste - Territoires en projet / Transforming Landscapes, Birkhäuser, 2020.
