= Abbas Gharib =

Iranian-Italian architect (1942–2025)

- عباس غزیب
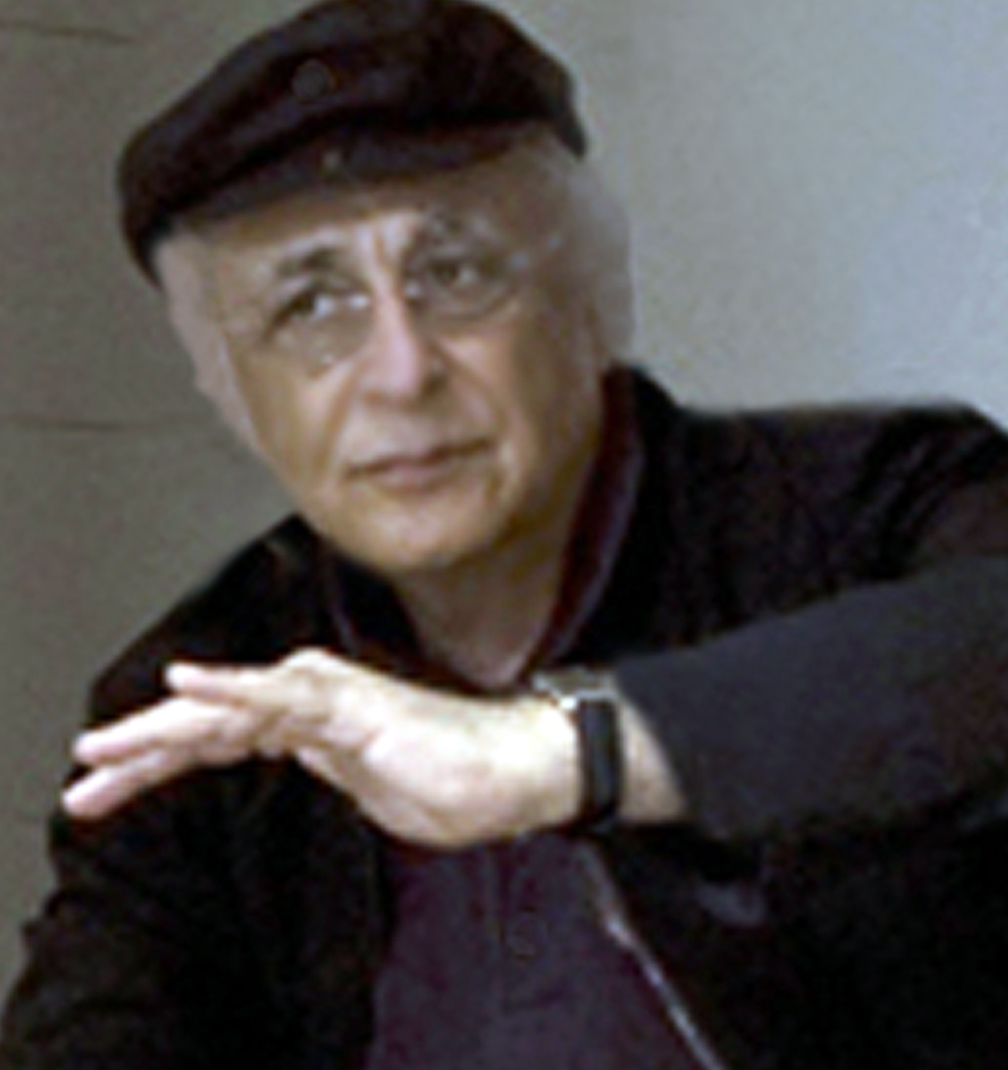
- Gharib in Verona, June 2008
- Born: 16 June 1942; Tehran, Imperial State of Iran
- Died: 6 February 2025 (aged 82); Verona, Italy
- Education: Università Iuav di Venezia
- Occupations: Architect; designer
- Years active: 1980–2025
- Website: studiogharib.net

Abbas Gharib (Persian: عباس غزیب; 16 June 1942 – 6 February 2025) was an Iranian architect based in Italy. He was an influential figure in the research, practice, and teaching of post-contemporary art and architecture.

== Life and formation ==
=== Early and adult life ===
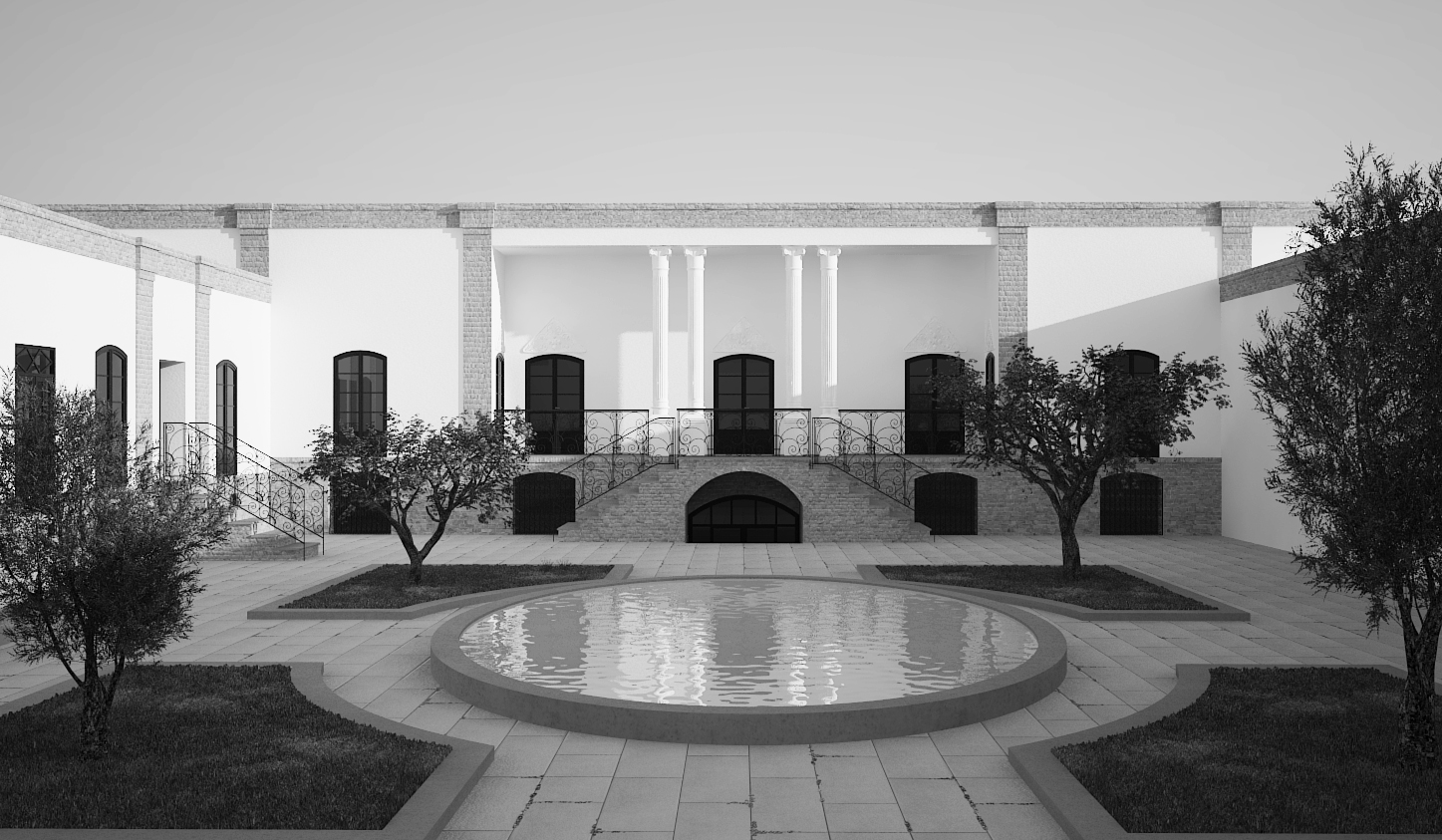
Abbas Gharib's home in 1951

Gharib was born in Tehran and raised in an Iranian family. The family resided in the old traditional center of Tehran. He completed his primary education in Tehran at Bersabé Primary School, Saint Luis Elementary and Ferdowsi middle school.

In 1952, his family moved to a new house in the northern part of the city, where he resided until 1960, when he received his diploma from Hadaf Educational Group high school. In 1958, he made his first visit to Europe, where he decided to leave his native country. In 1962, he moved to Italy and enrolled at the University IUAV of Venice, where he remained until 1973, participating in the city's educational and artistic life. As a child and later as a student, he showed an early interest in geometry and drawing. In 1972, he married an Italian architect, Sandra Villa, and had two children with her- Samì (12 January 1972), now a sociologist, and Leila (28 February 1983), now a musician.

=== The choice of Venice ===
In May 1958, at the end of an extensive trip through the main European cities, Gharib, then aged sixteen, visited Rome for the first time. He was deeply impressed by the city's beauty and the richness of its art and architecture. In 1960 he returned to Europe and Italy, journeying through the peninsula from north to south. The beauty of Venice, its cultural and artistic lifestyle, and the presence of creative figures like Peggy Guggenheim, Lucio Fontana, Allen Ginsberg, Ezra Pound, and Carlo Scarpa in the Sixties and Seventies, influenced him to settle there. This move from his origins in Tehran was central to his future direction.

=== Education ===
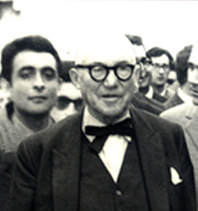
April 1965, with Le Corbusier University IUAV of Venice, Italy.

He studied architecture at the Università Iuav di Venezia and in 1969 qualified in urban planning, though he never abandoned his interest in architectural projects and design. This dual interest is evident in his practice.

In the 1980s, he shifted from two-dimensional evaluation of projects to three-dimensional evaluation of complex perspectives. This was an influential area in his post-graduate self-formation, freeing him from the Modernist grid towards unconfined volumes characterized by transparency, fluidity, flexibility, and smooth, dynamic curving surfaces.

=== Professional practice ===
Gharib became a licensed architect in 1969 and practiced in Venice until 1973. From 1974 to 1980 he worked outside Italy. In 1981 he opened his office in Verona, Italy, under the name of Studio Gharib, Architecture & Design. The design method in his studio is fluid and meta-metric, as opposed to the abstract methods and metric process of Modernism. The multiple sequences of spatial sections and the successions of constructive models have replaced flat and static drawings. The Studio, in collaboration with professionals, has ventured into a wide range of disciplines, striving to break the boundaries imposed by traditional constraints. This unconventional approach to design has produced a spirit of independence, reflected in the research and works created by the Studio. The forms of spaces and objects are reflected in numerous designs for architectural competitions, professional projects, and buildings, evidencing a multi-disciplinary approach.

=== Design criteria ===
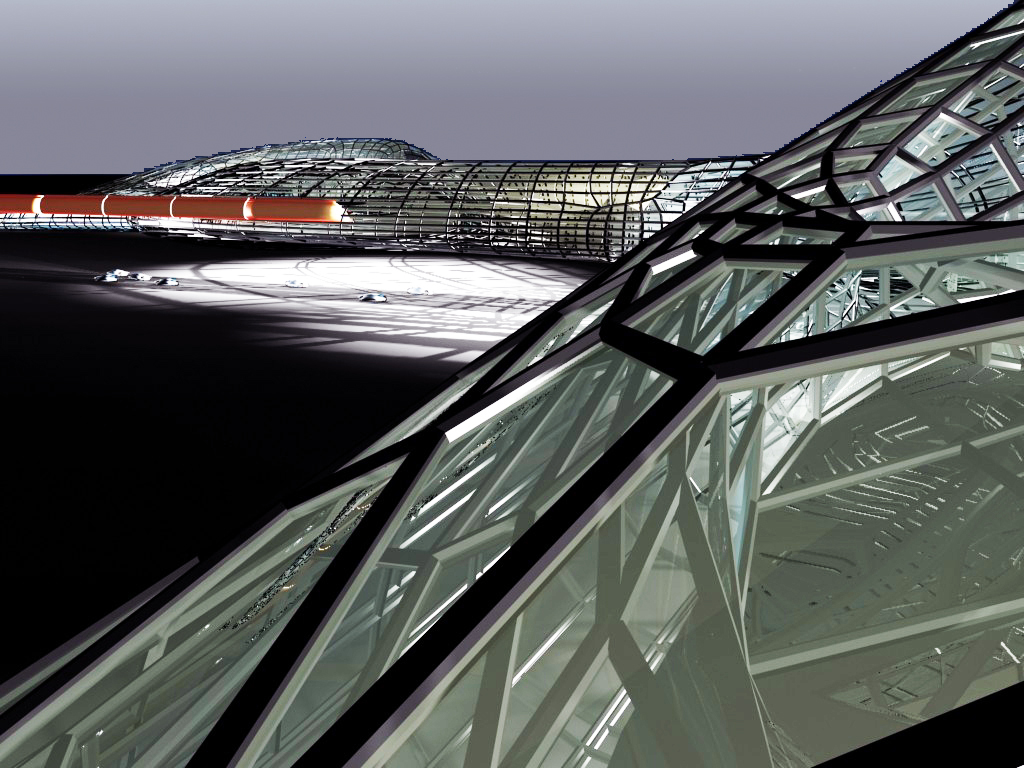
POL Culture and Art Centre: "Fluid, Flexible and Dynamic"

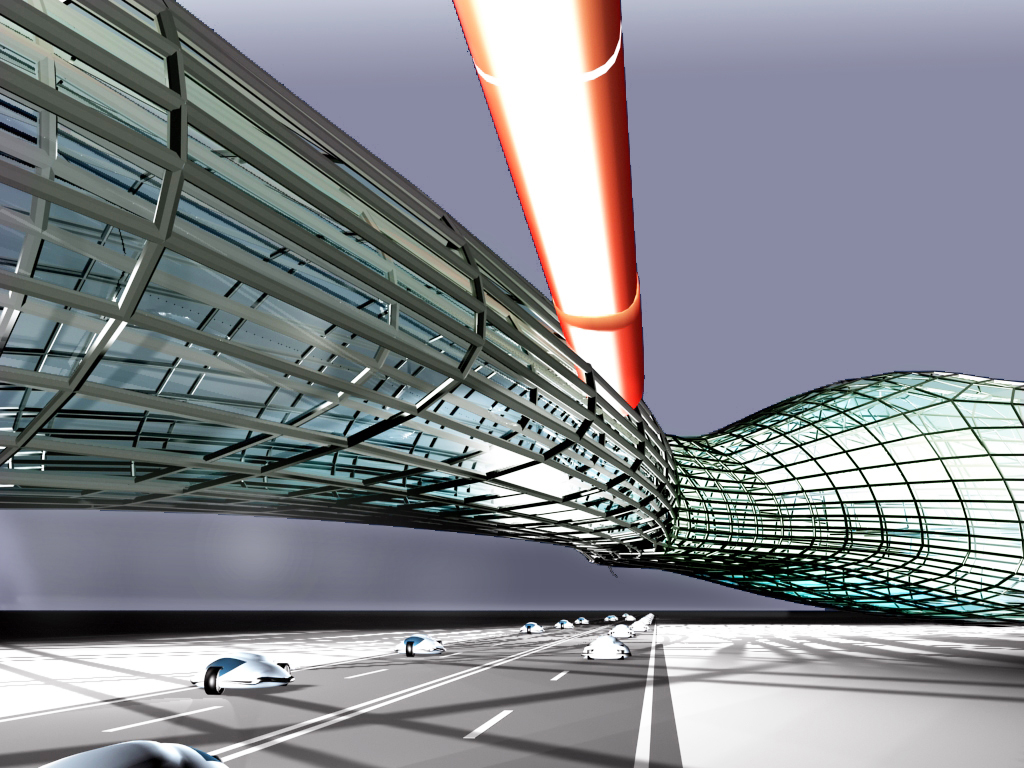
POL Culture and Art Centre: "Continues, Smooth and Heterogeneous"

Gharib gradually distanced himself from Modern Movement design methods, considering them abstract and self-referential. He oriented himself towards the post-contemporary movement and Complexity Theory, which, in his view, had a closer relationship with the shifting context. He was aware that these components, interacting with politics, economies, science, technology, and social movements, generated sophisticated results that required complex solutions. The Studio transitioned from the traditional notions of modern Rationalism to the concept of anthropo-geo-morpho-genesis—from ideas of Morphology and Topography to the advanced science of Morphing and Topology. Consequently, design, for both architectural spaces, urban planning, and physical objects, is based on renewed attention to interactive relationships between space and the surrounding context. This recognition of the interactive dynamics between nature and culture and between social and economic components has been accompanied by digital integration of projects into three-dimensional spaces, replacing the linear, flat, two-dimensional projections typical of Modernist methods.

=== Shifting to social architecture ===
The Pritzker Architecture Prize of 2014, awarded to Japanese architect Shigeru Ban, places him among the first to move towards Social architecture and to share the new trends in architectural planning. This prompted leading architects to consider the lifestyle of social architecture instead of personal styles.

For the renovated approach of his Studio in Italy, creativity stands in promoting design solutions able to feed urban regeneration as cultural, inventive, educational, and functional diversities for new languages and lifestyles. This avoids repeating mannerist projects and their results, believing that creative solutions are fed by environmental components rather than by designers.

His role in evolving the method of creative development in the Tenstar Community Association proposes an education that transforms urban regeneration into added value through the interaction of creative disciplines via the development of an integrated set of creative disciplines. This added value allows the users of the projects to meet their operational needs in an area renovated with a sustainable long-term economy based on knowledge use (knowledge-based production) rather than on energy dispersion (energy-based production).

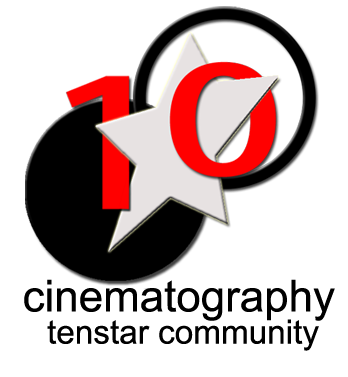

=== Approach to cinema and music ===
As one of the founders of Tenstar Community, a multidisciplinary cultural Association, he was involved with the Association's sectors, such as cinema, music, visual arts, and photography, besides architecture and urban regeneration. These involvements included designing workshops and events for these disciplines or being invited as a jury member in film festivals such as San Giò Film Festival and participating in workshops such as the one with Iranian Director Abbas Kiarostami, who was awarded the Tenstar Community Cinematography Prize 2015: "Why Cinema."

== Conferences and lectures ==
- "19th century interventions in Vienna: Reading of the Ring", lecture at University IUAV of Venice, Italy, 1971.
- "Topics of the New Architectural Trends", lecture at University of Tehran, Faculty of Architecture, Iran, 1973.
- "Tribal memory in the architectural thought", at the International Congress of Architecture, Shiraz, Iran, 1975.
- "Monuments of underdevelopment", lectures at University IUAV of Venice, Italy, 1976.
- " Self-expressive buildings", lecture at the University of Tehran, Faculty of Architecture, Iran, 1978.
- "Post-modernism, deconstruction and folding in architecture", at the cycle of conferences organized by the Ministry of Housing and Construction, Tehran, Iran, 1985;
- "The Toppled Garden", lecture given to the "Società Letteraria", Verona, Italy, 1992.
- "The Mirror Garden", lectures at the "Course of garden arts", University IUAV of Venice, Italy,1993.
- "Lines, thoughts and design assumptions", lecture at the "International Day of Furniture", organized by "Abitare il Tempo", Verona, Italy,14–18 October 1993.
- “Post-contemporary: danger and opportunity": lectures at the Institute for Urban Studies in Architecture USA Institute, Verona, Italy 1994.
- "Space: continuous, cohesive, and heterogeneous", lectures at the Institute for Urban Studies in Architecture New York, N.Y., US.
- "Space: continuous, cohesive, and heterogeneous" lectures at Teague University, Department of Architecture, Teague, Korea, 1995.
- "Space of the urban place", at the international design seminar for the new building of the University IUAV of Venice, Italy, 1996.
- "Paradigms of complexity in architecture new trends", lecture at "AGAV" Conference, the Young Architects Association, Verona, Italy, 2000.
- "Design, Design system, and Design of professionalism", lectures at Academy of Fine Arts, Verona, Italy 2000 – 2010.

== Awards ==
1971

- Competition for a new student hostel building, Piovego Padua, Italy, second prize.
- Competition for the sculptural work in the psychiatric hospital, Marzana Verona, Italy, second prize.

1975

- Competition for the urban and architectural planning of the seaside city of Rudsar, Rudsar Caspian Sea, Iran, third prize.
- Competition for the new headquarters of the Iranian National Insurance Company "Bimeh", with Shahab Katouzian, first prize.

1979

- Competition "The Sun and the Habitat" for the use of alternative energy in residential and educational buildings, Valpantena, Gruppo Ferro", Verona, Italy, first prize.

1980

- First European competition for the use of solar passive energy, Giudeca, Venice, Italy selected project.

1982

- Competition for the new headquarters of "AGEC", Verona, Italy, selected project.

1983

- Competition for the Center of Social and multipurpose recreational performances of Scaligero Castle of Villafranca, Verona, Italy, second prize.

1992

- Regional competition for the furniture design organized by the association of industrialists of Treviso, Italy, second prize.
- Competition for the transformation of the monumental furnaces of Asolo, Italy with the construction of the new administrative, production, and exhibition center of ceramic arts, third prize.

2001

- Competition for the headquarters of the Center for the Development of High Technology in Iran: "Fadak", (Senior Design Consultant to Bahram Shirdel and Partners Office), first prize.

2006

- Competition for Center for the Study, Development, Exhibition and Promotion of Carpets and Rugs, (With Studio M. Eccheli & R. Campagnola), Tabriz, Iran, third prize.

2009

- Competition of "Housing Development for the Mediterranean Countries" in Leverano of Lecce, Leverano Italy selected project.

== Publications ==
- National Iranian Insurance Company Competition

"The prize winners of the national competition to design the new headquarters of "Bimeh", the National Insurance Company of Iran", "Art & Architecture Magazine 31/32, Tehran: Art & Architecture Editions, December 1975, 39 – 47.

- Iran National Library

"The International Architectural competition", Art & Architecture Magazine 45/46, Tehran: Art & Architecture Editions April 1978, 119.

- Il Sole e l'Habitat

"Gruppo Ferro", acts of the national competition: the sun and the habitat for the use of alternative energy in residential and educational buildings, Rome – Italy: Kappa, November 1981, 296 – 299.

- 600 Contreprojets pour les Halles

"Consultation international pour l'amènagement du quartier des Halles de Paris" Volume, Volume, Paris: Editions du Moniteur, 1981, 377.

- Ghadjar pavilion

"Abbas Gharib e Sandra Villa – sistemazione di un padiglione Ghadjar presso Tehran", Architettura nei paesi islamici, Second International Architecture Exhibition, la Biennale, Volume, Venice – Italy: La Biennale di Venezia Editions, 1982, 278.

- Ponte dell'Accademia,

Maffioltti, Serena. "ricerca", Costruire Magazine 33, Biennale di Venezia issue, Milan – Italy: Abitare Segesta, October 1985, p. 235.

- The tower where the desire can live

Gharib, Abbas. Verticelli, Danilo. Villa, Sandra. "The neo-eclectic house – projects for the cultural design exhibitions for the Italian furniture fair", Abitare il tempo, volume, Venice – Italy: Arsenale, 1992, 93, 112.

- The self-expressive object

Gharib, Abbas. Verticelli, Danilo. Villa, Sandra. "Room with a View, Abitare il tempo, volume", Bologna: Grafiche Zanini, 1993, 37–42, 108.

- Open house, section x – x

Gharib, Abbas. Verticelli, Danilo. Villa, Sandra. Abitare il tempo, Volume, "Ten years of research, experimentation and new perspectives", Bologna – Italy: Grafiche Zanini, 1995, 221.

- Open house section x – x

Dorfles, Gillo. "Events", Ottagono Magazine 110, Review of Abitare il tempo, Milan – Italy: CO.P.IN.A., March 1994, 83 – 84

- "Accademia G.B. Cignaroli – Verona"

“Ricognizioni Design 360° Magazine 14", Oggetto locale Issue, Verona – Italy Grafiche Aurora, 2001, cover, 27

- New National Museum of Korea

"Abbas Gharib – Italy, International Architectural Competition for the new National Museum of Korea" Volume, Seoul: Hae-jak Kang / Ki Moon Dang Editors, 1995, 362

- Accademia G.B. Cignaroli – Verona, Ricognizioni Design 360° Magazine, Oggetto locale Issue, No. 14, cover & page 27, Grafiche Aurora Publisher, Verona 2001.
- Design Works

Gharib, Abbas. interviewed by Grego, Susanna. "cronache di design a Verona" in the Magazine of the Architectural Association of the province of Verona 57, Verona – Italy: Studio 12, June 2002, cover, 31–33

- Last Works

Gharib, Abbas. interviewed by Grego, Susanna. "Ozio Creativo sarà il lavoro del futuro?" in the Magazine of the Architectural Association of the province of Verona, No. 62, Verona – Italy: Studio 12, April 2002, 34 – 35.

- Iran Oil Industry HQ, Tehran,

Arnaboldi, Mario Antoni. "Abbas Gharib, due mondi due lingue", L'Arca, the international magazine of architecture, design and visual communication No. 181, Milan – Italy, l'Arca S.p.A. Editori, May 2003, cover, 68–71.

- Competition for the Center of Cooperation in High Technology, Iran, Memar Quarterly Magazine of Architecture and Urban Design 13, Tehran – Iran:Kia Naghsh, 2003, 74 – 80
- Headquarters of Iran Oil Industry in Tehran

Arnaboldi, Mario Antonio. “Architecture: Dialogues and Letters – 12, Ad Abbas Gharib per l'Headquarters dell' Iran Oil Industry a Tehran", Milan – Italy: Mimesis, 2004, 185, 203–204.

- Main projects

Gharib, Abbas. Interviewed by Ahmad Zohadi. "For a methodology of project. A tool toward the future – An interview with Abbas Gharib, Iranian Architect", Tehran – Iran, Architecture, Construction and E-Sciences Magazine 1, Contemporary challenges, architecture and thought issue, Tehran, Zolal Editors, November 2004, cover, 24–29.

- Abbas Gharib "Pol" Art & Cultural Center

Candani, Elena. "Meeting between two worlds", L'Arca, the international magazine of architecture, design and visual communication 220, Milan – Italy: l'Arca S.p.A. Editori, December 2006, 48–53

- Super Compact,

"Progetti per il mobile 2008", Dossier Compo Mobili, Furniture Design Magazine, European furniture components 53, Snatarcangelo Romagna (RN): Magioli SpA.Editore, January 2009, 68

- Recent projects

Gharib, Abbas. interviewed by Castelluci, Alessandra. "Equilibrio di architettura (tra due mondi)", Studio Gharib – Verona, In Cariera & Professioni Magazine 2, Bologna – Italy: Golfarelli Editore, June 2008, 36–39

- Progetto N. 44

Dell'Osso, Guido R. "Edilpro, Architettura bioclimatica e sostenibilità nella casa per i paesi del Mediterraneo", Casarano (Le) Italy: Il tacco d'Italia Editore, November 2009, Volume, Cover, 73–79

- Carso 2014+, International design competition

"Arch. Abbas Gharib", Abitare Magazine 509, Milan – Italy: Abitare Segesta, 2011, 25

== See also ==
- Post-contemporary
- Tenstar Community
