= Tenstar Community =

Tenstar Community, often known simply as "TEN", is a Third Sector not-for-profit movement and association in Verona, Italy.

TEN is committed to social regeneration, focusing on education, culture and creativity by creating interactivity within TEN creative sectors of architecture, arts, cinematography, design, environmental engineering, photography, graphics, music, performing arts and urban regeneration.

TEN sustains artists and creative people in the creative economy and the green economy and by inviting and working with influential professionals.

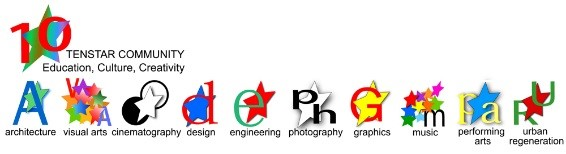

== History ==
Tenstar Community Movement was created in 2000 by Abbas Gharib with other professionals and artists in Europe and the Middle East to support creative people and to defend their sectors. Its initial name was "Ten - International Developments", with actions in the post-contemporary domain.

In 2008, this Platform moved to Italy.

== Mission and vision ==
TEN's commitment is to social regeneration, by working within creative sectors. It works to contribute to the journey from the existing energy-based society, to one based on knowledge.

The mission wants to rebuild the artistic and cultural heritage of the city. These are capable of accommodating art and culture experiences, creation of employment with sustainable production.

== Leaders ==
The organizers of "Tenstar Community" in Italy are Sandra Villa, an architect and designer, Samì Gharib, a sociologist and expert in communication and Leila Gharib who is a Musician and art performer.

TEN's commitments match the current economic and social needs of innovation, so that the ten creative areas and the ten goals of the Association remain active in the educational, cultural and creative sectors, that are engines for growth and development, claiming "creative citizens' rights" for a knowledge society, a World Without Poverty.
