= Post-contemporary =

Aspect of philosophy

Post-contemporary Dynamical Systems

Post-contemporary (PoCo) is an aesthetic philosophy which posits that the aesthetic experience is universal to humanity, and that this experience can inspire understanding and transformation. It has developed in tandem with new theories of emergence in complexity science, as well as advances in biosemiotics. In art historical terms, "modern" and "contemporary" arts are limited to their era and are defined by stylistic and philosophical parameters - chief among them, a critique of the classical European tradition and constructive philosophy, and secondly, the contemporary ethos is characterized by an emphasis on transient or exclusively contemporary issues which reflect the zeitgeist.

Modernism, post-modernism and contemporary art follow the tradition of deconstruction and questioning, while post-contemporary emphasizes generating new, constructive hypotheses. However, modeled after the scientific method, both modes are inter-dependent as the question/answer cannot exist without each other. Thus, post-contemporary views the history of the humanities as branching and pluralist, rather than a linear path of development. Consequently, PoCo has chosen a forking path, builds upon knowledge from all eras, and values quality, sublimity, and empathy above novelty. PoCo emphasizes empathy for all, regardless of race, gender, sexual orientation, or creed.

Post-contemporary as a concept was first described by Italian poet Primo Levi. The first documented use of the specific term was in 2005 by Abbas Gharib in a conversation with Bahram Shirdel, two architects of Iranian origins, both proficient in Western culture and participants in the current debate. The conversation was published by Sharestan Magazine, 55 . 2007. The discussion took this definition also to distinguish the third millennium epitomes of creative sectors, by their projection into coming avant-garde configurations, toward future. To day in its own progress, the post-contemporary concepts are much better defined.

== Characteristics and attributes ==
By the 1990s, the "transitional contemporary" as the plethora of Western thoughts was mainly expressed in intellectual patterns, by borrowing tools from functions such as fluidity, flexibility, dynamicity, continuity, heterogeneity, smoothness, and transparency or by acquisition of concepts from transitional philosophy such as multiplicity, difference, repetition, nomadic and "weak thought". In the 2000s, the opening of minds and matters to the social contexts of sciences, technologies and to the means of physical environments, as well as to the organizational contents of political and economical components, helped the post-contemporary propositions to shift from the contemporary assumptions toward a new universal theory for retooling the educational, cultural and creative systems. In the same decade, the 2008 global financial crisis led to a need to redefine social, political and economical resources, as the organizational components of territories. These are the needs of re-appraisals on the industrial societies, for the implantation of post-contemporary organizational contents by the paradigms given by sciences and technologies toward the means of physical environments from micro-systems. to the macro-organizations and vice versa.

== Post–Euclidean mathematics and geometries ==
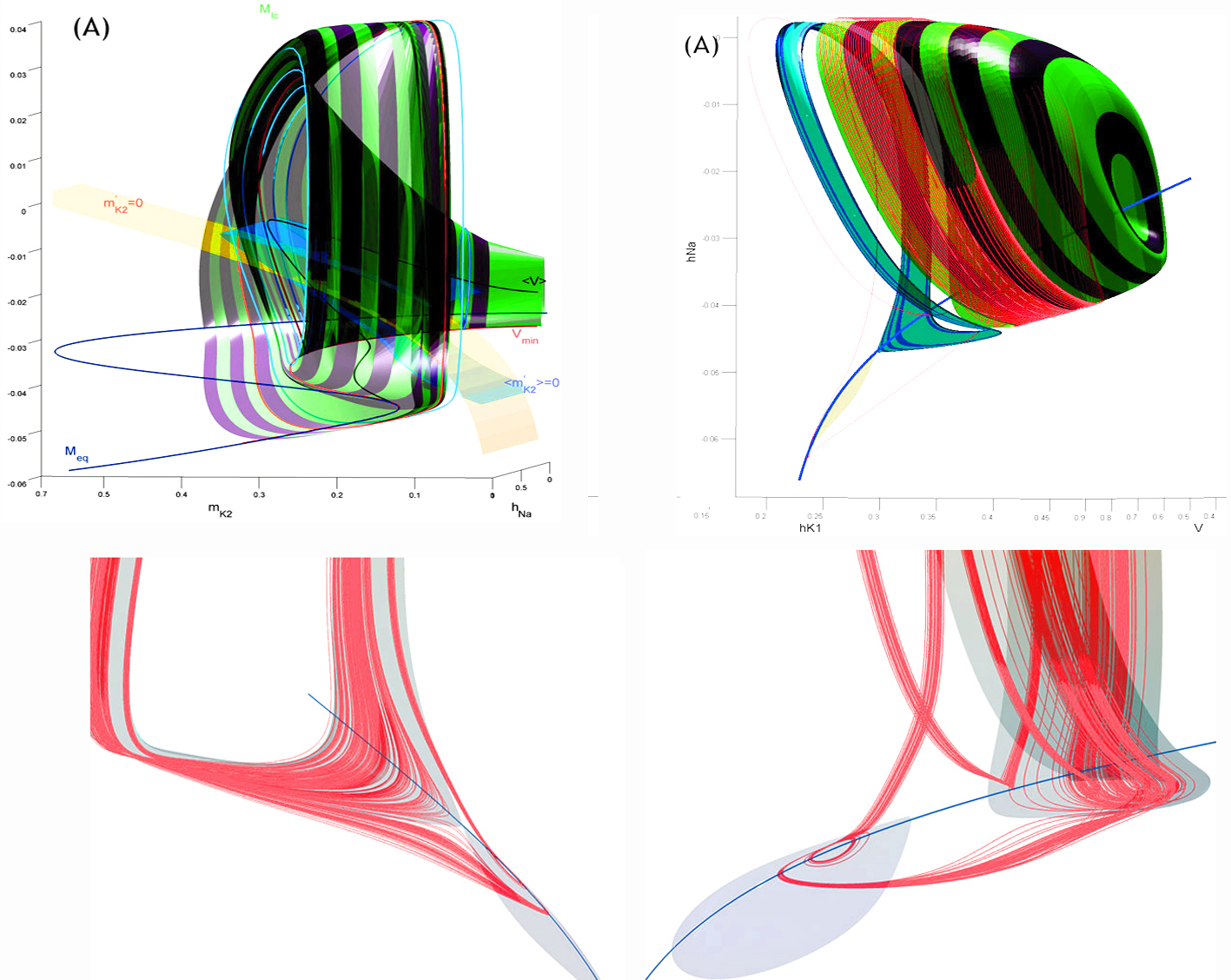
Methods of Qualitative Theory in Nonlinear Dynamics Leonid P Shilnikov, Andrey L Shilnikov Dmitry V Turaev, Leon O Chua

The origin in diversely phenomenological systems and exact models from life sciences is in the area of the theory of applied dynamical systems and global bifurcations. The special interest in the subject can be found in a new emergent cross-disciplinary field known as mathematical neuroscience. Its scopes include nonlinear models of individual neurons and networks. In-depth analysis of such systems requires development of advanced mathematical tools paired with sophisticated computations. For instance, Andrey Shilnikov, a neuroscientist and mathematician derives models and creates bifurcation toolkits for studying a stunning array of complex activities such as multistability of individual neurons and polyrhythmic bursting patterns discovered in multifunctional central pattern generators governing vital locomotor behaviors of animals and humans. Thanks to the non linear qualitative dynamics, the organization of holistic nature of post-contemporary lineage was implemented by interoperativity and interactivity within the heterogeneous components and characters of micro - systems, being present in many concrete social contents and in most territorial resources. In this way post-structuralism as well as the new sciences of complexity, complexity theory and chaos theory, were appropriated and interpreted within micro - systems by means of "self-creation", expressing a fundamental dialectic among structure, mechanism and function, identifiable and recognizable in concrete territorial contexts.

== Relevances to architecture and design ==
In the field of architecture, the flourishing endeavor of "architecture of complexities" or customized "folding" theory for architecture in the transitional contemporary architecture are outstanding examples. The matter is well distinct by Patrick Schumacher from Zaha Hadid Architects issued as Parametric Pattern.

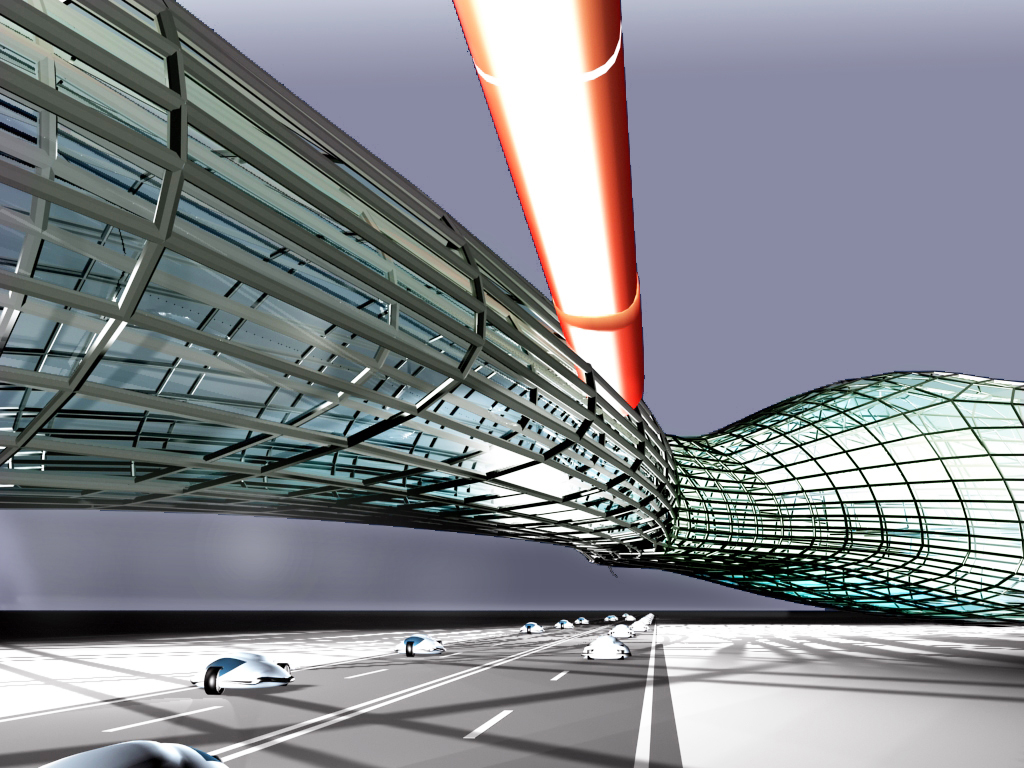
A. Gharib, POL Culture and Art Centre: Continues, Smooth and Heterogeneous

The use of digital and parametric techniques have created a new spatial organization in urban design, architecture, and design that values the organizing form over the abstract function. This is a new method, out of the modern abstractions, versus its two-dimensional projections and against its typical linearity and flatness. Later, an important critical topic was written on this subject by Farshid Moussavi a London-based architect and university teacher of Iranian origins.

The holistic dynamicity of post-contemporary paradigm and its built-in capacities for design agenda, incorporates the ten creative sectors such as architecture, urban design, engineering, design, graphics, art, photography, cinematography, music and performing arts. Architecture must adapt itself to the post-contemporary social and technological conditions and innovate by absorbing its influences.

The passage from the "star system architecture" to the social design is also improved by awarding the social architecture of Shigeru Ban, a Tokyo-born, architect by Pritzker Architecture Prize 2014, who designs for private clients, and uses the same design approach for his humanitarian design efforts.

== Visual arts ==
In the visual arts, post-contemporary has taken the form of representational painting, photography, sculpture and mixed media, which addresses current issues in globalized culture. The New Britain Museum of American Art was the first to dedicate a room to post-contemporary art, in their permanent collection - highlighting their new collection with a discussion panel on the term. The centerpiece of this collection is Graydon Parrish's The Cycle of Terror and Tragedy—a painting concerning the attack on the World Trade Center on 9/11.

== Sociological replica ==
Post-contemporary society is strongly related to the values of sustainability, putting in plain words the description of a civilization that meets the higher human real needs for a vast majority in an advanced post-industrial universe, shifting forward from Fordism and Tylorism industrial managements. In addition, the post-contemporary bestows our social opportunities to flourish in the utmost of their potential creativity, rather than struggling with the precast sachems or the sinkings in artificial consumerism. The objective therefore is to resolve the causes which go against the self flourishing, the self-fulfillment jointly with the collective harmony, by purge them from the routine of contemporary habits and adopt those post-contemporary values such as creativity, holism, complexity, quality, passion, interconnection, responsibility foremost, the jurisprudence of citizenship ... This is an education versus the universal belief for the continues economic growth, is a training in order to gain the ability to grasp complex systems within long-term problems, is an exercise against the human tendency which buries the uncomfortable truths or the habit to relate only to what can be seen close to us and see only one cause to one effect. All these or even more are preventing our safe passage toward a sustainable world.

== Economical structure ==
Large crowds of interests, constitute in associations and foundations, such as Tenstar Community, Omid Foundation and many other progressing third sector institutions, as new creative class are forming their economic contents and values as the third sector economy, out of the general logo-centric illiteracy of previous century economy. Hence, the learning of the alphabet, the language and the paradigms of the 21st century actions become an ineluctable imperative. This fact is mainly applicable to the economical structures proposed by Post-contemporary vision, which its prosperity and richness creates in an added value out from the profit maximization of speculative economy based on old capitalism of industrial productivity. Post-contemporary assets are recourses from dynamic social economy, pro-profit-no-dividend which its plus value is subject to immediate reinvestment in problem solving, in economy of culture, in creative economy and creative education as the new third sector operations.

== Philosophical overview ==
Amongst the great varieties of creative fields, disciplines and sectors, the post-contemporary knowledge is represented more generally by philosophy and aesthetic. It makes the paradigms and languages of the 21st century, where so far is resisting and should resists to the intellectual temptations for its contamination and re-theorization through the both modernist and post-modernistpast idioms. " ... resistance, first against being forced in certain tempting directions and against the trends in current popular opinion, against the hole domain of imbecilic interrogation, … But I think that … as Primo Levi said, the creating would be resistance …." Beside, the dynamism of post–contemporary progression is conical and shifts from micro - to macro - systems, along the complex paths of its continued improvements and recognitions. In fact, the advancing of this knowledge is totally antithetical to the expansions of the modernist, the post-modernist and the contemporary obsolete cultural heterotopias. It is quite comprehensible then, why the novel post-contemporary action has brandished the weapon, obtained from the powerful tools of complex systems, against the unstoppable and cyclical rebirth of the "modernist" rhetoric, which has blind faith in the reality of single and singular "fact", as an ideology against multiplicity, and idiom which terrifies from the universal and generalizable knowledge, thus, the modernist and the post-modernist thought, has no existence without a pulse of continuous driving of the abstract "theorization" in its many contradictory aspects, as a symptom that requires continuous intervention for the correction of its own paths of survival. Today within these paths, the two antithetical approaches, the temptations of intellectual reconstructions and the appeals of cultural works are still present as a system of total empiricism. The abstract theorization of the first idiom generates perpetual tautology and the second produces the rhetoric of communication and language. In fact, the new post - contemporary paradigm and language is far from the daily vocabulary of cultural routines, making opposition to modernism and post-modernism idioms by identifying it-self through what is constructive in the progressive intellectual trends of today, projecting their new directions into the coming future. In this complex context, Po-co's innovative paradigm is looking for new varieties of intervention and fresh forms of knowledge. In this sense, every single isolated act from the realm of conventional theory, results inappropriate, inconvenient and unmentionable, while the post-contemporary look for new types of intervention and new kinds of insights”.
One step back, a glance at the contemporary culture, which is still modernist and post-modernist, shows how the relative contents are completely characterized by heterotopia, logocentrism, historicism, tautology and rhetoric. These are as dominant ideologies that for the most part are unnecessary replication of the related intellectual, subjective and abstract productions, thus evoking the need for the transition to the post- contemporary paradigms.

== See also ==
- Intellectual movements in Iran
- Creative industries
