= Landscript =

Architecture term

Landscript is a word created by architect Seung H-Sang to describe his architecture. He published a book with this word as well. In that book, he describes it as follows:

Like our fingerprints and the lines in our palms, the memory of the past remains imprinted on all land. As every fingerprint is unique, so is the pattern of every piece of land. Sometimes its pattern is created from natural history; sometimes it is a pattern imprinted through the continuity of human life. The record and story of our lives are written on the land. The land is thus a grand and noble book of history, and thus is as precious as precious can be. Let us call this the landscript.

— Seung H-Sang, Youlhwadang Landscript: The Inscription of Nature and Life on the Land ]
