= Ahmad Zohadi =

Iranian architecture scholar, publisher (born 1969)

- Born: 2 May 1969 (age 57); Iran
- Education: Civil Engineer, Master of Architecture
- Alma mater: Tehran Azad University, Dubai Azad University
- Occupations: Architecture publisher; theoretician; researcher; author
- Spouse: Negin Farokh
- Writing career
- Notable works: 2A Magazine, 2A Continental Architectural Awards
- Website: ahmadzohadi.com

Ahmad Zohadi (Persian: احمد زهادی) is an Iranian architecture scholar, publisher and researcher. Currently, he is the CEO and editor-in-chief of architectural magazine 2A Magazine.

He is also the founder and chief editor of ‘Architecture & Construction’, a Persian quarterly magazine, published since 2003, and distributed in Iran.

== Early life ==
=== Education ===
Ahmad was born in Tehran. On completion of his primary and secondary education, he attended Karaj Islamic Azad University in the year 1992 for Civil & Structure Engineering. Simultaneously, he was editor and publisher of Tehran-based Architecture and Construction Magazine & 2A Magazine.

=== Personal ===
Ahmad has been known to show keen interest in photography right from his childhood. He got involved in architecture and construction after associating himself with architectural journalism. He got married in the year 2013 to Negin Farrokh. Together, they have a son named Radan.

=== Appreciations and recognitions ===
- Arab Engineering Schooling Bureau & Harvard Design School
- United Nations Educational Scientific and Cultural Organization, UNESCO Chair in Islamic Architectural University of Tehran
- ECO Cultural Institute Headquarters, Tehran
- The Kamla Raheja Vidyanidhi, Institute For Architecture And Environmental Studies
- The Catholic University of America, School of Architecture and planning
- College of Architecture + Planning, The University of Utah
- Centre of Middle Eastern Studies, Harvard University
- North Carolina State University a land-grant university and a constituent institution of the University of North Carolina
- Al Ahmadiah - Contracting & Trading
- Nakheel, Retail Shopping Malls
- Canadian University of Dubai
- Centre for Middle Eastern Studies, Harvard University

== 2A Magazine ==
He is the current CEO and editor-in-chief of 2A magazine. It is an architectural magazine dedicated to different provincial architectures of the world, being distributed all through Middle East Asia.

== 2A Continental Architectural Awards ==
Ahmad Zohadi is the founder, organizer and director of 2A Continental Architectural Awards organized since 2015 – award organized under the banner of the 2A magazine. The first award was the 2A Asia Architecture Award 2015, held on July 15, 2015, at Istanbul Technical University, Istanbul.

== Film career and interviews ==
He produced a documentary in 2012 on Indo-Iranian culture, history and architecture, which he wrote, produced and directed. He has also interviewed a number of famous personalities like Foster and Partners, Balkrishna Vithaldas Doshi, Sergei Tchoban, Seung H-Sang, Bahram Shirdel, Richard S. Levine and John Alexander Smith.
