= Richard Levine (architect) =

American architect

- Born: September 11, 1939 (age 87); New York City, New York, U.S.
- Education: Rhode Island School of Design, Rensselaer Polytechnic Institute
- Known for: Raven Run Solar House; Hooker Building; Sustainable Area Budget
- Scientific career
- Fields: Architect, Professor, Sustainability Pioneer
- Workplaces: Center for Sustainable Cities, http://www.centerforsustainablecities.com CSC Design Studio, http://www.cscdesignstudio.com

Richard Steven "Dick" Levine (born September 11, 1939) is an American environmental architect, solar energy and sustainability pioneer, and professor at the University of Kentucky. He is one of the early solar energy innovators in the U.S., a holder of U.S. patents on structural systems and solar energy applications, and the architect of a number of award winning solar buildings including his widely published Raven Run Solar House (1974). Levine is co-director of the Center for Sustainable Cities at the University of Kentucky. His contributions to sustainable urban planning are in both the theory and practice of the sustainable city-region. He has over 150 publications on solar energy and sustainability research, conducted in Italy, Austria, China and the Middle East.

== Biography ==
Richard Levine was born in Queens, New York. He attended Forest Hills High School. After spending a year in the chemical engineering program at the University of Rhode Island, Levine enrolled at the Rhode Island School of Design to study his true passion, Architecture. While a student at RISD, Levine invented the Coupled Pan Space Frame structural system, for which he later received a United States Patent. Levine holds a B.S.Arch from Rhode Island School of Design (RISD) (1962), and an M. Arch from Rensselaer Polytechnic Institute (1963).

Levine currently divides his life between international urban sustainability research projects through The Center for Sustainable Cities, its European Union partner institutions, and private architectural practice as principal of the CSC Design Studio.

== The Solar Energy Movement ==
Levine has been a national and international advocate for solar architectural design, and was the Founding Chair of the Sustainability Division of the American Solar Energy Society (ASES). Levine's Raven Run Solar House (1974) was the first to combine passive solar building design and active solar systems with earth tubes, an attached greenhouse, super insulation, "sundows," and a patented air collection system. Recognized as being ahead of its time, the house continues to be published today. His Hooker Office Building (1978) with its double glass walls with insulated aluminum louvers between them, has become the prototype for numerous energy conserving commercial buildings in Europe.

== Sustainability ==
Levine's academic work is notable in that he is concerned with the ways in which the form and process of architectural design can produce operational sustainability. This scale of analysis is unusual for an architect, and even for an urban planner. Levine's work has since encompassed the multi-scale nature of sustainability.

== Center for Sustainable Cities ==
The Center for Sustainable Cities is an interdisciplinary academic and design think-tank co-founded by Richard Levine and Ernie Yanarella, a professor of Political Science at the University of Kentucky. The Center is housed in the College of Design. The Center supports research and projects both locally and internationally, developing both the theory and practice of the sustainable city-region. The Center for Sustainable Cities is closely associated with a partner European institution- Oikodrom: the Vienna Institute for Urban Sustainability, in Austria.

=== Operational Sustainability ===
In developing the Operational Definition of Sustainability, Levine and his colleagues recognized the need for approaches to ecological balance that embrace local needs and work within the needs and signals of culture and natural resources, requiring feedback at a quantifiable and appropriate scale. It is among the earlier operational definitions of sustainability.

Sustainability is a concept that has many definitions, the United Nations definition of sustainability is the most widely used. It defines sustainable development as: "development which meets the needs of the present without compromising the ability of future generations to meet their own needs". Because sustainability is expected to achieve many things, the UN definition is not universally-accepted and has undergone various interpretations. Sustainability has been called an essentially contested concept. What sustainability is, what its goals should be, and how these goals are to be achieved, is open to interpretation and manipulation. As a result, international policy in sustainability has largely come to be a reactionary means by which unsustainability is mitigated.

The Operational Definition of Sustainability is a guideline for a proactive approach to negotiating ecological, cultural, and civic balance, while providing for concrete measures of accountability that preclude a simple "greening" approach. Through years of interdisciplinary collaboration between ecologists, social scientists, and urban planners, the Center for Sustainable Cities has developed the only interdisciplinary operational definition of sustainability:

Sustainability is a local, informed, participatory, balance-seeking process, operating within its Sustainable Area Budget, exporting no harmful imbalances beyond its territory or into the future, in so doing opens spaces of opportunity and possibility.
–Levine, Dumreicher, Yanarella

This definition has been recognized as a concrete basis for local sustainable development by negotiating resources within a Sustainable Area Budget (SAB)(see below), using the Sustainable City-As-A-Hill(see below) as its urban form. The Operational Definition provides a strong basis for both theoretical and operational integration with the emerging fields of: Ecological Economics, Industrial Ecology, Sustainability science, Stakeholder Analysis, Material Flow Analysis, Environmental Justice, Life Cycle Analysis, Complexity Science, Biomimicry, Social policy, Public Policy, Systems modeling, Ecology, and Ecological Design.

==== Aalborg Charter ====
Richard Levine was the principal author of the Aalborg Charter, ratified at the First European Conference on Sustainable Cities and Towns, which took place in Aalborg, Denmark in 1994. The charter is part of the United Nations Agenda 21 framework for the delivery of local sustainable development put forward in the United Nations Conference on Environment and Development (Earth Summit), held in Rio de Janeiro on June 14, 1992. The program calls on local authorities to engage in Local Agenda 21 processes that take a holistic view of the sustainability process.

=== Sustainable Area Budget ===
Levine's main contribution has been to unite the fields of sustainability, urban design, and sustainable development with a scale-based proposal integrating urban form with computational rigor. The Sustainable Area Budget (SAB) is a land-based aggregate from which a city-region can draw its resources and negotiate those resources on a regenerative basis. The SAB is similar to the Ecological Footprint approach to computational sustainability, which allows an individual to calculate the impact of personal consumer decisions on the natural environment. Footprint approaches only provide information as to how an individual can decrease negative ecological effects.

The SAB, in contrast, is an operational tool for negotiating balance. It offers far greater flexibility and political leverage than footprint approaches alone. This is because the SAB negotiates resources at the scale of the city-region according to its population, not at the scale of personal action from a pre-defined set of choices. Integral to the SAB theory is a formal relationship between an agricultural countryside and a dense urbanistic human-scale city.

=== The Sustainable City-As-A-Hill ===
The Sustainable City As A Hill has been in development since the early 1980s. It is a comprehensive sustainable urban framework, an operational alternative to inherently unsustainable modern patterns of city construction and development. It is an urban model that achieves integrative design at an appropriate building scale and allows for the negotiation of sustainability within the boundaries of an appropriate regional scale (using the SAB). The City-As-A-Hill preserves the civic character, and pedestrian scale of a traditional village, with all of the civic, residential, and commercial activities taking place on the outer surface of the city.

Inspired by the formal elements of medieval Italian Hilltowns, Levine developed a family of urban forms that respond to the human-scale social requirements of a city. Medieval Italian cities were cities upon a hill. Their metropolitan boundaries were walled off for defensive purposes, leading to an evolving language of dense urban forms and clear contextual restrictions on the limits of urban development. Levine's City-As-A-Hill takes the medieval model and carves out the interior, building a three-dimensional structure of usable commercial and industrial space within a dense pedestrian city. This city is metabolically tied to a surrounding hinterland of agricultural and ecological resources. The management of these resources is negotiated within the Sustainable-Area-Budget, according to the aggregated fair earth share of its citizens. The City-As-A-Hill has been modeled in a number of contexts: in Korea, Austria, and the Appalachian region of Kentucky.

== Sustainability-Driven Architecture ==
Levine is the principal architect at the Center for Sustainable Cities Design Studio (CSC Design Studio), a full-service architectural and urban design firm that specializes in zero-energy building projects for public and private clients. When designing at the building-scale, Levine's firm is one of a few architectural practices in the United States to employ the European Passive House Standard, which is the most rigorous energy standard for building design in the world.
Levine has referred to his architectural work as "sustainability-driven," recognizing that the scale of the single building is inadequate to comprehensively address sustainability. Nevertheless, buildings account for an average of 48% of energy consumption, more than any other sector. This renders energy & carbon neutrality in architecture a powerful point of leverage for energy independence, environmental protection, and economic advantage.
Levine's work is notably antithetical to the typical response to addressing sustainability within the field of architecture. This approach calls for "greening" of existing building designs, pursuing individual cost-effective tweaks, or checklists of actions, within the conventions of an outdated and inefficient building industry. Levine's approach has consistently been to avoid "picking the low-hanging fruit," (e.g. changing light bulbs & installing more efficient windows) in favor of considering the building as a whole system (e.g. constructing a super-efficient building envelope & providing for natural daylighting and the use of passive solar). Because of this integrated design system, Levine's designs require 90% less energy for climate control, and 75% less for electricity. When buildings are designed from such an efficient standard, remaining energy needs can be obtained by an affordable photovoltaic electricity generating array.

The CSC Design Studio headquarters is itself a zero-net-energy building, with annual electricity consumption offset by a 5.25 Kw Photovoltaic array installed in 2009.

== Patents ==
Coupled Pan Space Frame (CPSF):

- Method of Molding Structural Matrices, U.S. Patent #3,229,004, 1966.

Super-efficient multi-stage solar air collection system:

- A Multistage Solar Energy Collector, U.S. Patent #4,092,978, June 1978.

== Interview with Richard Levine ==
Ahmad Zohadi has created a series of questions in the form of interview in relation to design and sustainability. A number of international practitioners, academics and thinkers have been selected and invited to participate and share their views. One of them is Richard Levine.
