= Wael Al Awar =

Lebanese architect

Wael Al Awar (born 1977 in Lebanon) is a Lebanese architect and co-founder of the architecture studio waiwai, based in Dubai and Tokyo. Al Awar's practice spans architecture, research and design, with projects across the Middle East and Asia. Known for his experimental use of materials and engagement with natural phenomena, his work often explores sustainability, light, landscape, and regionally specific construction methods. In 2021, he co-curated the United Arab Emirates Pavilion at the Venice Architecture Biennale, where the project Wetland was awarded the Golden Lion for Best National Participation. He served as Creative Director of Architecture for the 2025 Bukhara Biennial and was responsible for the masterplan of the renovation of Bukhara's heritage district.

== Biography ==
Al Awar holds a bachelor of architecture degree from the American University of Beirut and a master's degree in circular economy management from the European Institute of Innovation for Sustainability. He began his career as an architect in Japan, working with Coelacanth and Associates in Tokyo. He founded ibda design in Dubai in 2009. In 2018, ibda design merged with Tokyo-based office Gingrich, led by Kazuma Yamao, to form waiwai. The firm was recognized as one of the top 17 architects and top 50 influential designers of the year by Nikkei Magazine in 2019, as well as one of the top 10 emerging firms in the world by Architectural Record's 2018 Design Vanguard issue. waiwai was also recognized as one of the top 50 offices in the Middle East by Architectural Digest in 2022. Beyond his architectural practice, Al Awar has lectured and spoken at institutions and events around he world, including TEDx Rome, the Vatican, MIT, and UNESCO. In 2023, Wael co-curated “Radical Yet Possible Future Space Solutions”, the New European Bauhaus Collateral Event of the 18th International Architecture Exhibition – La Biennale di Venezia, alongside Hans Joachim Schellnhuber and Francesca Bria. He is a contributor to The World Around and its Young Climate Prize, where he has also served as a mentor.

== Work ==
In 2021, Al Awar co-curated, alongside Kenichi Teramoto, the National Pavilion of the UAE at the Venice Architecture Biennale, which received the Golden Lion. Their project, Wetland, presented a prototype of an environmentally friendly salt-based cement alternative from recycled industrial waste brine, which could reduce the impact the construction industry has on the environment.

In 2024, he presented the installation Barzakh at the inaugural Abu Dhabi Architecture Biennial, a pavilion composed of many intricate and interlocked modules of plastic, palm fiber, and wastewater brine. The project used solidified brine from desalination processes to create an ephemeral structure that addressed environmental cycles and local resources. After the Biennial, Barzakh mas moved from its original waterfront site and installed permanently on Saadiyat Island.

Other significant works include: Mosque of Reflection in Dubai, which "reframes the spaces to encourage community use alongside its purpose as a sacred space of worship"; Hayy Jameel in Jedah, a creative complex intended to host cultural and artistic programs, which "won multiple accolades including Gold in the Hong Kong Design Awards; Silver in the New York Design Awards; and the Honor Award for Exceptional Design by the American Institute of Architects (Middle East chapter)"; and the Bukhara Cultural District project, launched in 2025, which involves the "restoration of dozens of Bukhara’s most important historic buildings, its mosques, madrassas [Islamic schools] and caravansaries [roadside inns]".
