= Silja Tillner =

Austrian architect (born 1960)

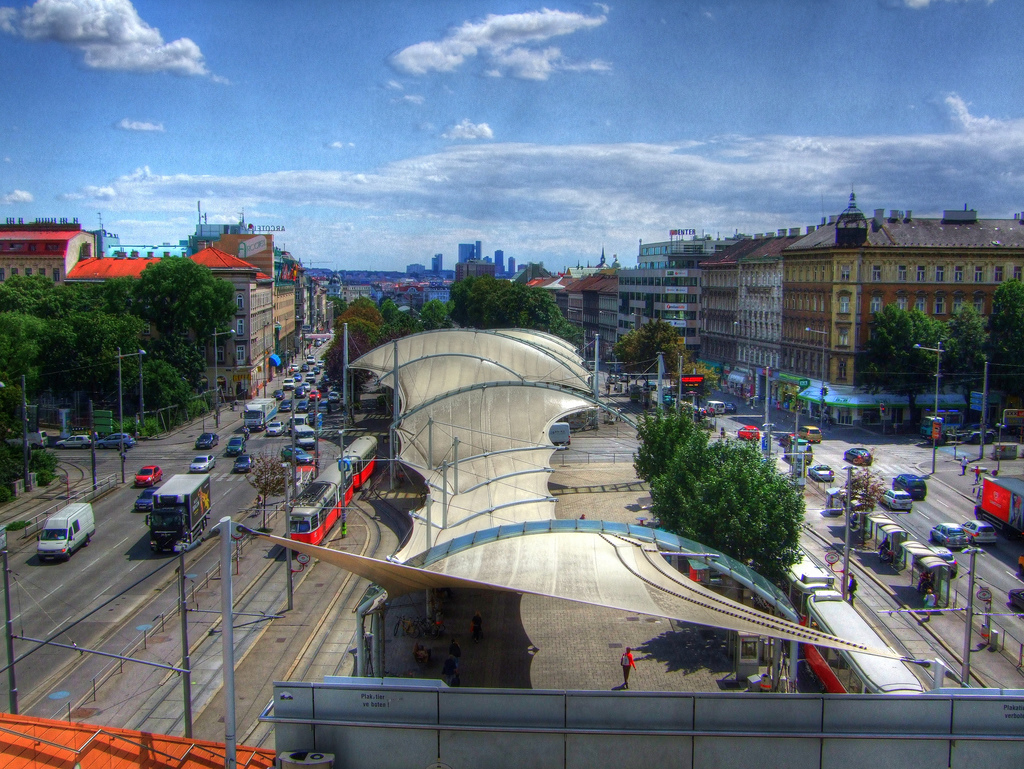
Tillner was project architect for the refurbishment of Urban Loritz Platz in Vienna

Silja Tillner (born 1960) is an Austrian architect. She is a Principal in the firm Architekten Tillner & Willinger ZT GmbH.

She received a Fulbright Grant to study Architecture at UCLA. Her UCLA master's thesis project was "The End of the Glendale Freeway Urban Design", Los Angeles, California, combining transit with community services. Her notable projects include Gürtel-Urbion (revitalization of Gürtel Boulevard, Retractable Cover of Vienna City Hall, and Spittelau Office Building.

The architect's office is focussing on "Urban Study and -Design, Land- and Site Use Concepts, Public Space Design, Membrane Constructions, Office Buildings, Urban Utitlity Buildings and Residential Buildings". The concept of their website is bilingual: English and German language. The office was originally founded 1995 by Silja Tillner. The cooperation with Dipl.-Ing. Alfred Willinger dates from 2003 and the shared enterprise Tillner & Partner ZT GmbH was established in 2005.
