= Hooman Balazadeh =

Iranian architect (born 1978)

- Born: 1978 (age 47–48); Iran
- Occupation: Architect
- Awards: RIBA International Emerging Architect Prize (2021), Architizer A+ Awards, 2A Asia Architecture Award, Villa Property Architecture Prize (2024)
- Practice: Hooba Design Group
- Projects: Kohan Ceram Central Office Building, Aptus Concrete Factory Showroom, Espriss Café, Ozgol Apartment

Hooman Balazadeh (born 1978) is an Iranian architect and the founder of Hooba Design Group, an architecture firm based in Tehran. Known for integrating traditional Persian elements with contemporary design and sustainable materials, Balazadeh's projects have received international acclaim, including the prestigious RIBA International Emerging Architect Prize in 2021.

== Career ==
After earning a master's degree in architecture in 2003, Balazadeh began his career at the prominent Iranian firm Shirdel & Partners. In 2007, and officially in 2009, he founded his own practice, Hooba Design Group (also referred to as Hooba Tarh), with a focus on culturally and geographically responsive architecture.

His design philosophy emphasizes sustainability, the use of local materials, and spatial concepts inspired by Persian architecture. A notable characteristic of Hooba Design's work is the frequent use of building materials sourced from clients' own factories, such as custom concrete blocks and bricks.

== Major works ==
Balazadeh and Hooba Design have designed a number of notable buildings in Iran:

- Espriss Café (Tehran, 2014) – A compact and thoughtfully detailed café interior, which won first place in the 2016 2A Asia Architecture Award (Interior Design).
- Ozgol Apartment (Tehran, 2018) – A residential project that explores vertical space and facade composition.
- Aptus Concrete Factory Showroom (Karaj, 2020) – Designed using concrete blocks sourced from the client's factory, emphasizing industrial aesthetics.
- Sharif (Peykasa) Office Building (Tehran, 2021) – Located near Sharif University of Technology, this office building highlights technological integration and functional design.
- Kohan Ceram Central Office Building (Tehran, 2020) – One of Hooba Design's flagship projects, this building features a distinctive double-brick-skin facade and was awarded the 2021 RIBA International Emerging Architect Prize.

== Awards and honours ==
=== Top Awards ===
- RIBA International Emerging Architect Prize (2021) – Awarded to Hooba Design Group for the Kohan Ceram Central Office Building.
- Villa Property Architecture Prize (2024) – Presented at the Villa Magazine Awards.
- Architizer A+ Awards (2021, 2015) – Winner in the “Best in Typology: Commercial” category.
- 2A Asia Architecture Award (2016) – First place in the Interior Design category for the Espriss Café.
- Iranian Interior Design Award (2014) – First prize awarded to Hooba Design.

=== Other ===
- Second place, Memar Award (2007) – Ehsan Pood Textile Factory
- First place, Iranian Interior Design Awards (2007)
- First place, First Iranian Facade Design Award (2008) – Iranian Architectural Identity
- Third place, Second Iranian Interior Design Awards (2009)
- First place, Third Iranian Interior Design Awards (2010)
- Second place, Memar Award (2013)
- First place, Iranian Interior Design Award (2013)
- Fifth place, Shar Group Competition (2013)
- Second place, Persian Standard Factory Competition (2013)
- Honorable Mention, Khosrow Shahi Garden Design (2013)
- First place, Memar Award (2019) – Public Category
- First place, Memar Award (2020) – Aptus Concrete Factory Showroom
- Second place, Memar Award (2021) – Hitra Administrative-Commercial Building
- Shortlisted, WAF Interior Design Award (2012)
- First place, Iranian Interior Design Award (2014)
- First place, 2A Asia Award (Turkey, 2015)
- First place, Architizer A+ Award (New York, 2015)
- Shortlisted, Brick Award (Austria, 2016)
- Winner, Main Architecture Prize – Kohan Ceram Central Office (USA, 2020)
- Shortlisted, Dezeen Awards – Kohan Ceram Central Office (UK, 2020)
- Nominee, Creative Design Award – Kohan Ceram Central Office (France, 2021)
- Winner, Architizer A+ Award (USA, 2021)
- Gold Winner, A' Design Award – Kohan Ceram Central Office (Italy, 2021)
- Shortlisted, WAF – Aptus Concrete Showroom (Portugal, 2021)
- Shortlisted, WAF – Kohan Ceram Central Office (Portugal, 2021)
- RIBA International Award for Excellence – Kohan Ceram Central Office (UK, 2021)
- Finalist, Architizer A+ Award – Aptus Concrete Showroom (USA, 2021)
- Finalist, Architizer A+ Award – Sharif Office Building (USA, 2021)
- Longlisted, Dezeen Award – Aptus Concrete Showroom (UK, 2021)
- Longlisted, Dezeen Award – Sharif Office Building (UK, 2021)
- Shortlisted, Brick Award – Kohan Ceram Central Office (UK, 2021)

== Philosophy ==
Hooman Balazadeh’s architectural philosophy centers on the integration of contemporary design with cultural authenticity and environmental consciousness. Deeply inspired by Persian architectural traditions, his work seeks to reinterpret historical elements through a modern lens, prioritizing harmony between built forms and their geographic and cultural contexts. Balazadeh places significant emphasis on material honesty, often incorporating locally sourced or client-produced materials—such as brick and concrete—as both functional and expressive elements. His approach fosters a dialogue between innovation and tradition, where spatial quality, light manipulation, and sustainable practices coalesce into cohesive architectural narratives. He has championed architecture that is not only contextually responsive but also economically viable, avoiding superficial ornamentation in favor of elemental, tactile, and environmentally attuned design solutions.
