= Mazères-sur-Salat =

- Commune
- Location of Mazères-sur-Salat
- Location within France Location within Occitanie
- Coordinates: 43°08′03″N 0°58′27″E
- Country: France
- Region: Occitania
- Department: Haute-Garonne
- Arrondissement: Saint-Gaudens
- Canton: Bagnères-de-Luchon
- Intercommunality: Cagire Garonne Salat

Government
  - Mayor (2023–2026): Albert Cigagna
- Area^{1}: 6.68 km^{2} (2.58 sq mi)
- Elevation: 303 m (994 ft)
- Highest elevation: 375 m (1,230 ft)
- Lowest elevation: 265 m (869 ft)
- Population (2023): 628
  - Density: 94.0/km^{2} (243/sq mi)
- Time zone: UTC+01:00 (CET)
  - Summer (DST): UTC+02:00 (CEST)
- INSEE/Postal code: 31336 /31260
- ^{1} French Land Register data, which excludes lakes, ponds, glaciers > 1 km^{2} (0.386 sq mi or 247 acres) and river estuaries.

Mazères-sur-Salat (French pronunciation: [mazɛʁ syʁ salat], literally Mazères on Salat; Occitan: Maseras de Salat) is a commune in the Haute-Garonne department in southwestern France.

== Population ==
Historical population
Year	Pop.	±% p.a.
1968	770	—
1975	660	−2.18%
1982	642	−0.39%
1990	590	−1.05%
1999	584	−0.11%
2007	596	+0.25%
2012	571	−0.85%
2017	621	+1.69%
2023	628	+0.19%
Source: INSEE

== See also ==
- Communes of the Haute-Garonne department
