= Seung H-Sang =

South Korean architect

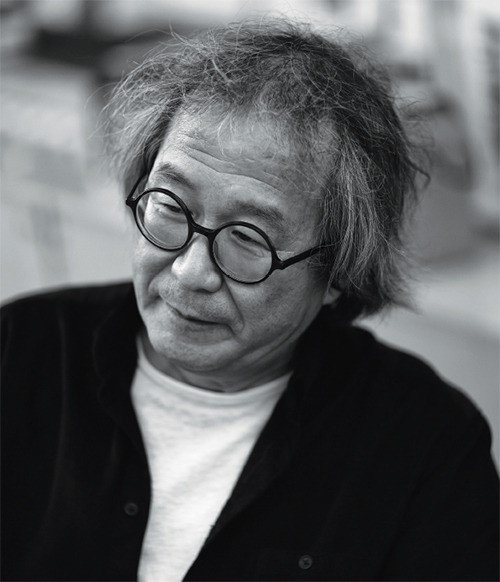

Korean name
- Hangul: 승효상
- Hanja: 承孝相
- RR: Seung Hyosang
- MR: Sŭng Hyosang

Seung H-Sang (Korean: 승효상; Hanja: 承孝相) is a South Korean architect who studied at Seoul National University and Technische Universitaet in Wien. After working for Kim Swoo-geun from 1974 to 1989, he established his own office IROJE architects&planners in 1989.

Seung was a core member of the 4.3 Group, which strongly influenced South Korean architecture, and participated in founding the Seoul School of Architecture for a new educational system. He is the author of Beauty of Poverty (1996 Mikunsa), Architecture, Signs of Thoughts (2004 Dolbegae), Landscript (2009 Yoelhwadang) and Memorial of Roh Moo-hyun (2010 Nulwa), and was a Visiting Professor of North London University and taught at Seoul National University and at Korea National University of Arts.

His works are based on his critical concerns with Western culture of the 20th century, particularly regarding the topics of beauty and poverty. His approach has been likened to the Critical Regionalist agenda because he derives, for example, an architectural logic from observations of the former slums of Geumho-dong in Seoul. He won various prizes for his practice and work and served as coordinator for Paju Book City. The American Institute of Architects made Seung an Honorary Fellow of AIA in 2002, and the Korea National Museum of Contemporary of Art selected him as Artist of the Year in 2002, which was a first for any architect, after which he hosted a grand solo architecture exhibition. Seung has gained worldwide fame as an architect by way of his architectural achievements and various international exhibitions, as well as has spread his architectural influence over Asia, Europe, and the Americas. In 2007, the South Korean government honored Seung with the Korea Award for Art and Culture, and he was commissioned as director for Gwangju Design Biennale 2011 after for Korean Pavilion of Venice Biennale 2008. He stepped down as the first City Architect of the Seoul Metropolitan Government in 2016. He also taught at TU Wien as a guest professor in 2017. He then worked as Chief Commissioner of the Presidential Commission on Architecture Policy of Korea from 2018 to 2020. In 2019, the Austrian Government awarded him the National Decoration the Cross of Honor for Science and Art, First Class. He is now a Chair Professor at Dong-A University and Distinguished Expert of CAFA Visual Art Innovation Institute in Beijing.

"Beauty of poverty. Here‚ it is more important to use than to have‚ to share than to add‚ to empty than to fill."

== Major works ==
- E-Mun291, South Korea, 1992
- Sujoldang, South Korea, 1993
- Subaekdang, South Korea, 1998
- Welcomm City, South Korea, 2000
- Commune by the Great Wall, Beijing, China, 2000
- Hyehwa Culture Center, Daejeon University, South Korea, 2003
- Chaowai SOHO, Beijing, China, 2004
- Korea DMZ Peach and Life Valley, South Korea, 2005
- 30th Anniversary Memorial Hall of Daejeon University, Korea, 2008
- Memorial for Former President, Roh Moo-hyun, South Korea, 2009
- 360 Earth Water Flower Wind Country Club, Yeoju, South Korea, 2009
- Teochon House, South Korea, 2010
- Art Villas, Jeju, South Korea, 2010
- Hyunam, Gunwi, South Korea, 2012
- Myung Films Paju Office, Paju, South Korea, 2015
- Public Cemetery Park ‘A Thousand Wind’, South Korea, 2016
- Soowoojae, South Korea, 2017
- Myungrye Sacred Hill, South Korea, 2018
- Bugye Arboretum ‘Sayuwon’ Wasa, Myueongjeong, Cheomdan, South Korea, 2019

== Books ==
- Beauty of Poverty (First edition: Mikunsa,1996; 30th anniversary revised edition: Slow Walk, 2016) (Korean-English Bilingual)
- Architecture, Signs of Thoughts (Dolbegae, 2004)
- Structuring Emptiness (Dongnyuk, 2005)
- The Cannon of Architect (Youlhwadang, 2005)
- Landscript (Youlhwadang, 2009)
- Memorial of President Roh-Moohyun (Nulwa, 2010)
- Paju Bookcity Culturescape (Kimoondang, 2010)
- Stories of 360° Country Club (Culturegrapher, 2012)
- Old things are all beautiful (Culturegrapher, 2012)
- 某用空間 (Typomedia, 2013)
- Seung H-Sang Document (Youlhwadang, 2015)
- Invisible Architecture Inconstant City (Dolbegae, 2016)
- Meditation (Dolbegae, 2019)
- Natured: IROJE Seung H-sang (Actar, 2019)

== Awards ==
- 1989: Certificate of Commendation from the Chief of Justice
- 1992: Prize Winner of Korea Institute of Architect
- 1993: Cultural Award of Kim Swoo Geun Foundation
- 1993: Main Prize of Korea Architectural Culture Grand Award
- 1994: Korea Architectural Culture Grand Award
- 1995: Seoul City Architectural Grand Award
- 1997: Busan City Architectural Grand Award
- 2007: Art & Culture Korea Award, President of Korea
- 2007: Paradise Award, Art & Culture Korea, Paradise Korea
- 2017: 13th Kyung-Ahm Prize, Special Prize
- 2019: Cross of Honour for Science and Art, First Class, Government of Austria
