= Académie d'architecture =

French learned society

- Organization medallion
- Established: 1840
- Focus: architecture
- Head: Paul Quintrand
- Members: 100
- Formerly called: Société centrale des architectes
- Location: Hôtel de Chaulnes, 9 Place des Vosges, Paris, France

The Académie d'architecture (French pronunciation: [akademi daʁʃitɛktyʁ]) is a French learned society whose purpose is the recognition of architectural quality. Founded in 1840 as the Société centrale des architectes (French: [sɔsjete sɑ̃tʁal dez‿aʁʃitɛkt]; English: "Central Society of Architects"), the society was renamed Académie d'architecture in 1953, reviving the name of the former Académie royale d'architecture, founded in 1671 by Jean-Baptiste Colbert.

== History ==
At the time of its founding, the main objective of the Société Centrale des Architectes was the organization of the architectural profession at a time when its status was unclear. In this period of intense construction activity related to the development of industry and technology, the major concern of the Société centrale was to define the nature and mission of the architect as an artist and qualified practitioner. Its legal status is as a recognized association of public utility under the terms of the law of 1901. Having achieved most of its original goals, the society renamed itself Académie d'Architecture in 1953.

== Description ==
The Académie d'Architecture is divided into four colleges: 220 permanent members (French architects of national and international reputation); 100 associate members (persons of French or foreign nationality who have contributed to the influence of architectural values); 70 foreign members (foreign architects of international reputation); and the college of benefactors (contributors of financial aid significantly furthering the prestige and development of the Academy). The Academy now concentrates on the promotion of the quality of architecture and spatial planning, encouraging them education and research; publishing books, organizing conferences and seminars on architecture and urban planning. Finally, conservation and the development of a major archive of original drawings and contributing to the knowledge of the history of architecture and architects.

The académie considers amongst its achievements; the organization and recognition of architecture studies at the École des Beaux-Arts, the realization of a state national diploma in France authorizing the use of the title architect, organizing the conferences and international meetings that lead to the creation of the International Union of Architects, the publication of the magazine L'Architecture form 1888 to 1940, The publication of the "Central Series of building works prices", commonly known as the "Série centrale des prix" from 1883 to 1998.
