= Antonio Martinelli =

French-Italian photographer

- Born: Venice, Italy
- Education: Università Iuav di Venezia
- Occupations: Photographer, Photojournalist
- Website: antoniomartinelli.net

Antonio Martinelli is a French-Italian photographer born in Venice, Italy. He currently lives in Paris.

== Early life, education and early career ==
Martinelli graduated from Università Iuav di Venezia (Istituto Universitario di Architettura Venezia).

From an early age he frequented the Venice Circolo Fotografico La Gondola. He became friends with Hugo Pratt and provided the introductory photographs for Pratt's book Corto Maltese - Fable de Venise.

In 1972, Martinelli's trip to India which resulted in multiple photographic projects for publications and exhibitions throughout Europe, in New York and in India.

In 1979, Domus magazine commissioned the photographer to report on the construction and installation of the Teatro del Mondo in Venice, a work by architect Aldo Rossi sponsored by the Venice Biennale. Martinelli followed the evolution of the work, from the laying of the structure's first pole on the barge to the introduction into the waters of the Teatro, through to the maiden voyage in the mist of the Venetian lagoon towards the Punta della Dogana, at the entrance of the Grand Canal. After that, he accompanied the Teatro on his journey to the Adriatic Sea until Dubrovnik.

The collaboration with Domus and the Biennale led to a work documenting the first exhibition of the Venice Biennale of Architecture: La Strada Novissima, installed in 1980 in the long Corderie building. The first photographer to have documented the Arsenal interiors, he used the experience for the book of Giorgio Bellavitis L'Arsenale di Venezia Storia di una grande struttura urbana.

His friendship with Aldo Rossi and other architects and historians such as Francesco Dal Co, Manfredo Tafuri, Mario Botta, Jean-Louis Cohen, Claude Vasconi, Henri Gaudin, Massimiliano Fuksas and Peter Zumthor, led to other collaborations and projects on Venice, Italy, France and Japan.

Martinelli's interest for architecture and landscapes also led him to work for the Italian Touring Club and publisher Franco Maria Ricci (FMR and AD Architectural Digest).

From 1980, he began his collaboration with Japanese architecture magazine A + U Architecture & Urbanism, for which he carried out numerous reports and monographs on global architecture.

== Projects ==
=== 1995–2005: The Daniell/Martinelli Project ===
Between 1995 and 2005, Martinelli worked on the Daniell/Martinelli project under the patronage of UNESCO. The project and its related exhibitions led to the books Oriental Scenery: Yesterday & Today; Travels to India, Yesterday and Today and Passaggi in India: Ieri e Oggi.

After reading Mildred Archer's Early Views India, Martinelli became interested in the work of English artists Thomas and William Daniell (respectively uncle and nephew), who travelled and photographed the Indian subcontinent at the end of the 19th century. After extensive preparation, Martinelli followed the same route as the Daniells through four trips to India starting at the end of 1995. He used the Daniells' diaries to identify the places visited, and then photographed the same locations so as to compare his photos with theirs. Various books about Martinelli's trip were published in France, the UK and India, and several exhibitions were also held: Victoria Memorial Hall in Calcutta in 2000, Paris in 2005, and Rome and New Delhi in 2011.

=== 2010–2011: The Lucknow Project ===
In 2010 and 2011, Martinelli and Paris Guimet Museum collaborated on a project comparing 19th-century and present-day photos of Lucknow, India for an exhibition called "Lucknow at the Mirror of Time".

=== 2001–2024: Collaborations with Point de Vue and Images du Monde ===
Between 2001 and 2024, he worked with French magazines Point de Vue and Images du Monde to produce dozens of reports in France, Europe and around the world which covered a wide range of subjects relating to art, culture, heritage and travel.

=== 2014–2015: The Deccan Project ===
In 2015, the Metropolitan Museum of Art in New York commissioned Martinelli to photograph the art and architecture of the Deccan region for the exhibition "The Deccan Through a Photographer's Lens, Return to Sultans of Deccan India, 1500-1700: Opulence and Fantasy" and its catalogue.

=== 2020: The ‘Paris-Souvenir-Paris' Project ===
Between 11 March and 5 May 2020, Martinelli and Luc Castel photographed the empty streets of Paris during the COVID-19 pandemic, but their work, commissioned by Éditions Delpyre, was never published.

=== 2021: Aldo Rossi Exhibition ===
Martinelli provided photographs of the Teatro del Mondo for the exhibition "Aldo Rossi: The Architect and the Cities" at the MAXXI Museum in Rome.

=== 2018–2023: The Nicolo' Manucci Project ===
Martinelli and Marco Moneta staged the exhibition "Nicolo Manucci: the Marco Polo of India" at the Fondazione dell'Albero d'Oro in Venice between April and November 2023.

=== 2022: Exhibition at the IUAV - University of Architecture in Venice ===
Il Teatro del Mondo - Venezia 1980. L'inizio di un viaggio'

=== 2023: The Dior Project in India ===
In March 2023, he was invited by Maria Grazia Chiuri, Dior's artistic director, to document the preparations and artistic events surrounding Dior's first fashion show in Mumbai, India.

=== 2021–2023 : The Modern Paris Project 1914-1945 ===
Martinelli was asked by architectural historians Jean-Louis Cohen and Pascal Mory to photograph a number of emblematic buildings constructed between the two World Wars for the "Paris Moderne 1914-1945" exhibition held at the Power Station of Art in Shanghai between July and October 2023. Martinelli's photographs illustrate two architectural walks in and around Paris.

== Collections ==
Photographs attributed to Martinelli are held in the Conway Library at The Courtauld Institute of Art in London.

== Exhibitions ==
- 1991 – L'Arsenale di Venezia - Paris, Institut Culturel Italien
- 1998 – Oriental Scenery: Then and Now, Art Today Gallery, New Delhi
- 1999 – Venise et le Théâtre du Monde : Hommage à l'architecte Aldo Rossi, Théâtre du Rond Point des Champs-Élysées, Paris
- 2000 – Oriental Scenery : Two hundred years of India's artistic and architectural heritage, Victoria Memorial Hall, Calcutta
- 2000 – Velha Goa, Fondaçao Oriente, Macau
- 2001 – Velha Goa, Maison du Portugal, Paris
- 2005 – Passages en Inde. Hier et Aujourd'hui, Conciergerie, Paris
- 2005 – Passaggi in India. Ieri e Oggi, Scuderie del Quirinale 2005
- 2011 – Oriental Scenery: Yesterday & Today, Indira Gandhi National Center for the Arts, New Delhi
- 2011 – Lucknow au Miroir du Temps, Musée Guimet, Paris
- 2012 – LaTendenza, Centre George Pompidou, Paris
- 2013 – Venice's Arsenale 1980 - Awaiting for a New Beginning, Art Moorhouse, London
- 2015 – Sultans of Deccan India, 1500-1700: Opulence and Fantasy, The Metropolitan Museum of Art, New York
- 2015 – In the Footsteps of Le Corbusier, Art Heritage Gallery, New Delhi
- 2018 – Pesaro, la splendeur d'une villa impériale, Institut culturel italien de Paris
- 2021 – Aldo Rossi: The Architect and the Cities, Musée MAXXI, Rome
- 2022 – Il Teatro del Mondo - Venezia 1980. L'inizio di un viaggio. IUAV, Venise
- 2023 – Nicolo' Manucci' le Marco Polo de l'Inde. Fondazione dell'Albero d'Oro Venise, Rome
- 2023 – Paris Moderne 1914-1945 Power Station of Art, Shanghai

== Publications ==
- Kanch Mandir Il Tempio degli Specchi (Franco Maria Ricci)
- Teatro del Mondo - Aldo Rossi (Cluva)
- India (Touring Club Italiano)
- Carlo Scarpa (A+U)
- Firenze (Touring Club Italiano)
- Mario Botta (A+U)
- The 20th Century Architecture and Urbanism : Paris (A+U)
- The 20th Century Architecture and Urbanism : Milano (A+U)
- Voyage en Inde (Citadelles & Mazenot)
- Palais du Rajasthan (Citadelles & Mazenot)
- Lucknow au Miroir du Temps (Filigrane)
- 2015 – Sultans of Deccan India, 1500-1700: Opulence and Fantasy, The Metropolitan Museum of Art - New York
- Islamic architecture of the Deccan, India, text by George Michell, Helen Philon; photographs: Antonio Martinelli, Woodbridge : ACC Art Books, 2018, ISBN 9781851498611
- Palaces of Rajasthan, Antonio Martinelli & George Michell, with Aman Nath, London : Frances Lincoln, 2005, ISBN 0711225052
- Paris architecture, 1900–2000 par Jean-Louis Cohen et Monique Eleb; photographies d' Antonio Martinelli, Paris : Éditions Norma, 2000
- India : yesterday and today : two hundred years of architectural and topographical heritage in India, aquatints by Thomas and William Daniell; modern photographs by Antonio Martinelli; text by George Michell, Shrewsbury : Swan Hill Press, 1998, ISBN 1840370718
- The Royal Palaces of India, George Michell; photographs by Antonio Martinelli, London : Thames and Hudson, 1994, ISBN 0500341273
- India, Antonio Monroy; photographs Antonio Martinelli and Roberto Meazza, London : Orbis, 1985, ISBN 0856139467
- Paris moderne, 1914–1945. Flamnarion Editions
