= Raffaella Laezza =

Italian architect and academic

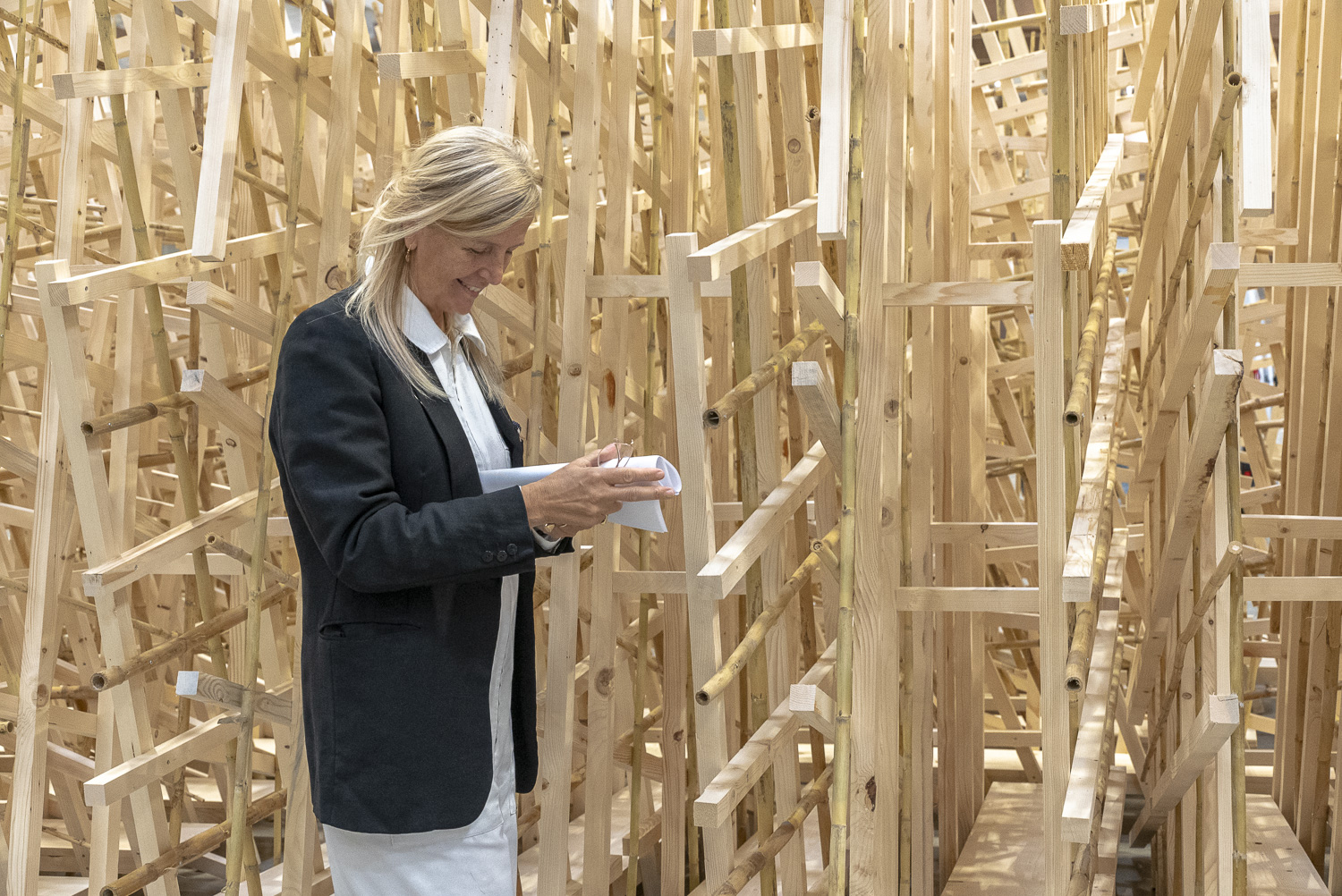
- Born: 16 January 1961 (age 65); Bruneck
- Education: Università Iuav di Venezia
- Occupation: Architect
- Website: raffaellalaezzaarchitecture.it

Raffaella Laezza (born 16 January 1961 in Bruneck) is an Italian architect, architectural theorist, essayist and academic whose work explores the deep relationship between natural systems and architectural design. She is known for developing the concept of Eco-Generative Architecture, a methodological approach integrating ecological processes, circular-economy principles, and carbon-neutral strategies into architectural practice. She conceives the architecture as a spiritual art (of building).

== Biographical notes and academic career ==
Laezza was born in Brunico and attended the Antonio Rosmini Scientific High School in Rovereto. She earned a degree in architecture from the Iuav University of Venice in 1991, graduating with 110/110 cum laude. In 1998 she received a scholarship to pursue doctoral studies, completing a PhD in Architectural Composition at Iuav in 2001 with a dissertation later published as L’architettura della linea terra (Osiride Edizioni, 2000).

Her academic formation included studies with Peter Eisenman and Manfredo Tafuri, and she later worked as an assistant to Franco Purini at Iuav University of Venice. Her early research explored relationships between the morphology of the natural ground and architectural form, laying the foundations for what she later termed Eco-Generative Architecture.

Laezza has taught architectural design at the Universities of Parma, Padua, Trento, Trieste, and Brescia. Since 2011, she has held the position of Scientific and Educational Director and Distinguished Visiting Professor of Architectural Design for the postgraduate master’s programs at the Iuav University of Venice.

She has been Visiting Professor at Hanyang University in Seoul, South Korea, and has lectured at the New York Institute of Technology. She works primarily between Milan, Venice, and Trieste and is a member of the Ordine degli Architetti, Pianificatori, Paesaggisti e Conservatori di Venezia, as well as IN/ARCH and AIDIA.

== Architectural theory ==
Her academic work is rooted in the tradition of Italian Rationalism and develops a methodological framework in which the creative process is conceived analogously to geological and biological growth. She relates the original principles of architecture to the codes of nature in order to re-establish the function of architectural design. Through studies ranging from macro to micro scales, she identifies what she terms “genetic codes”: geometric, modular, and constructive principles that underpin her architectural experimentation. From her mentor, Peter Eisenman, she learned the method of architectural codes; however, while Eisenman derives these codes from history, she draws them from both history and nature. In short, Laezza’s theoretical research focuses on design methodologies that integrate natural processes and sustainability principles into architectural practice.

=== Eco-Generative Architecture ===
Eco-Generative Architecture is the central concept of her research. The methodology incorporates circular-economy principles and carbon-neutral strategies from the earliest phases of design. It proposes a relationship between natural systems and the geometric, structural, material, and modular principles of architecture.

The approach begins with the study of natural forms at both macroscopic and microscopic levels, defining the macroscopic-scale natural forms as "Linea Terra," a terminology derived from the Italian for "ground". Observed patterns are translated into generative rules that guide the definition of geometries, structures, material systems, and energy-management strategies. The process is conceived as analogous to the development of a natural organism.

Her research on the relationship between architecture and nature is grounded in her book Leonardo da Vinci architetto, which includes an afterword by Paolo Zellini (Mathematician) and Federico Gallo (Director of the Ambrosiana Library in Milan). The book was presented at Pordenonelegge in 2022.

== Architectures ==
Laezza’s early design work concentrated on sacred architecture—a further proof that she conceives architecture as the spiritual art of building: she presented Sacred You. Multireligious Urban Center at the 10th Venice Architecture Biennale. In 2008, she was invited by the Italian Episcopal Conference (CEI) to participate in the competition for a new church and parish center in Dresano, Milan. Over the course of her career, she has participated as project lead in numerous international contests, including the final phase of the competition for Nuovo Polo Giudiziario in Trento (2008) in collaboration with Peter Eisenman; the competition for Piazza Castello–Foro Bonaparte in Milan (2016–2017), where her proposal Bio Parco Sonoro was selected for the final phase and exhibited at Palazzo Cusani during the Salone del Mobile in 2017 as part of the installation In Absentia. Developed with Luigi Semerani and Arup Engineering, the project envisioned a large-scale system of 191 vertical elements integrated with lighting and sound design, informed by Cartesian and vector-based geometric principles derived from nature.

In 2020, she designed and oversaw the installation of what is described as Italy’s first monument dedicated to people with disabilities, Umberto Laezza. Qui con i suoi amici istante dopo istante eroi, in collaboration with the Municipality of Rovereto. The monument, made from a local natural stone stele and a tree, was officially inaugurated in a public ceremony on 7 July 2025.

She has chosen temporary and itinerant architecture as a field of experimentation for her theories, where new formal and material languages align with ecological principles. For multiple editions of Futura Expo in Brescia, she curated the architectural design of the pavilions. Among these are the Vegetal Pavilion and Futura alata e coltivabile, which are linked by their emphasis on sustainability and all carry carbon neutrality certification. The Vegetal Pavilion was also exhibited in 2023 at Palazzo Piacentini-Vaccaro in Rome, the headquarters of the Ministry of Enterprises and Made in Italy.

=== Notable projects ===
- Umberto Laezza. Qui con i suoi amici istante dopo istante eroi – Rovereto, 2025
- Futura alata e coltivabile – Futura Expo, Brescia, 2025
- Vegetal Pavilion – Futura Expo, Brescia, 2023
- Growing Sequence Circular Pavilion – Futura Expo, Brescia, 2022
- Cobo Pavilion – Bauma, Munich, 2022 and 2019
- Time Pavilion – Smart City Material Village, Fuorisalone, Milan, 2018
- In Absentia – Palazzo Cusani, Fuorisalone, Milan, 2017
- Sottilissimo Templum – Il Mosnel, Franciacorta, 2015
- Sottilissimo Templum – Ca’ Balbi Valier, Venice Biennale of Architecture, Venice, 2014
- Eco Media Travel Space – Rimini, 2011

== Social engagement ==
Laezza is involved in social and environmental initiatives including Treedom and the Patto per la Sostenibilità Brescia 2050. She is a member of Cooperativa Impronte, which was founded in Rovereto by her family under the name Cooperativa Iter, and of the organization Un Sogno per la Vita Onlus in Trieste; both organizations are active in supporting people with disabilities. In 2024, she signed the Manifesto di Assisi, an initiative promoting sustainable and human-centered economic development.

== Publications ==
- NATURA D'ARCHITETTURA 1–7. Taccuini per una teoria d'architettura – LetteraVentidue, Syracuse, 2024
- Latina finzione | Tafuriana | E la passeggiata – in Anfione e Zeto n.31, Peter Eisenman e l’Italia, Il Poligrafo, Padua, 2024
- L’ombra e la grazia nel fraseggio dell’Essai di Étienne-Louis Boullèe in Firenze Architettura n.2/2024, Firenze University Press, Florence, 2024
- CRASH. Peter Eisenman. Iuav Venezia 1986–87 – LetteraVentidue, Syracuse, 2022
- LEONARDO DA VINCI ARCHITETTO INQUIETE SEQUENZE. Dieci interrogazioni di architettura — natura contemporanea – LetteraVentidue, Syracuse, 2021
- Codici del temporaneo. Manifesto di architettura – LetteraVentidue, Syracuse, 2018
- Alfabeto materico per Franco Purini – in Scritti in onore di Franco Purini, Iiriti Editore, Reggio Calabria, 2016
- Città della cultura della Galicia, Santiago de Compostela – Edizioni Unicopli, Milan, 2004
- Terra_Formless, Indice – in Parametro: international review of architecture and urban planning, n.254, 2004
- Progetti e conversations di: Gianluca Milesi, Bruno Juricic, HOV, Raffaella Laezza, Nicole_fvr – in Parametro: international review of architecture and urban planning, n.254, 2004
- Ritualità e notiziario di un margine urbano degradato – in Città e luoghi. Materiali per la "città rimossa", Gangemi Editore, 2004
- L'architettura della Linea Terra – Osiride, Rovereto, 2001
- Ostinazione – in Arc Architettura Ricerca Composizione n.5, 1999

== Conferences and academic initiatives ==
Laezza serves as Scientific Director and panel curator for academic events. Her latest initiatives include Stone is... (2025), a forum on the contemporary role of natural stone held at the Iuav University of Venice and featuring the participation of Peter Eisenman (Special guest of the forum), Walter Mariotti (Director of Domus Magazine), Claudia Chiappino (Mining Engineer), Francesco Canali (Director of Veneranda Fabbrica del Duomo di Milano), Kinue Horikawa (Fondazione Angelo Mangiarotti), Najla El Zein, Suguru Watanabe (Kengo Kuma and Associates), Angela Vettese, Christian Pongratz (Professor at New York Institute of Technology), Maria Perbellini (Dean of New York Institute of Technology), Peter Harrison (Stone Consultant), Giovanni Santamaria (Associate Dean of New York Institute of Technology). As the Panel Developer, Scientific and Educational Director, she organized Zero Room. New University for CO₂ = 0 Architecture (2025), GENS Public Programme, Venice Biennale of Architecture, Venice, Italy, 2025. This last event resulted in her Call for Action for the proposed new university project NAU_Natura Architettura Università, which advocates for an architectural curriculum grounded in the relationship between nature, architecture, and human beings.

=== Notable conferences and curatorial work ===
- Zero Room: New University for CO2=0 Architecture – GENS Public Programme, Venice Biennale of Architecture, Venice, 2025
- Fragile Eco Generative Architectures – New York Institute of Technology, New York, 2025
- Stone is... – International Forum at Iuav University, Venice, 2025
- Nature, Architecture's own University – Silver Fir_Diab Pavilion, Ca' Balbi Valier, Venice, 2021
- Think Tank FederUnacoma – Reggio Emilia, 2018
- Touch Fair Architecture & Exhibit Space – Piano Pavilion Project, Iuav University, 2017
