= Gino Finizio =

Italian designer and architect

Gino Biagio Finizio (born in Salerno, 10 March 1941-died in Milan, 15 June 2022) was an Italian designer and architect based in Milan, Italy. He is known for his contributions to design management.

== Career ==
Finizio worked for several years (1963–1986) as marketing and design director for companies such as 3M Italia, B&B Italia, and Giorgetti Meda. Since 1986, he works as design manager and designer for industrial companies, research centers, and engineering firms (Alfa Romeo, Aprilia, B&B Italia, Fiat Auto, Fincantieri, IBM, and Kartell among others). In 1990, Finizio started working as a corporate trainer by designing and coordinating the Master in Management of IPSOA. In 1991, he designed and managed the first master's degree in "Design and Management" at the Faculty of Architecture of the University Iuav of Venice, then at Politecnico di Milano and Sapienza University of Rome. In 2001, he became co-director of the Master "Transportation Design & Management" at the Faculty of Design at the Politecnico di Milano.

== Works ==
Finizio's first work, Design e Management: gestire l'idea (ISBN 978-8884911728), illustrates a broad summary of the role of marketing in design and in industrial products and discusses the interdependence between design and business. His latest book, Architecture & Mobility: Tradition and Innovation (ISBN 978-8861300712), deals with the car as an object which changed the 19th-century city into a metropolis of suburbs and highways. In the book, various architects are asked to explore how urban planning, architecture, and design ideas can create a new design philosophy for the automobile as a sort of domestic moving space that interacts with the new urban environment. The book focuses on the relationship between the static city and "mobile architecture" of the car through the works of some contemporary architects.

== Honors ==
In 2005, Finizio obtained an honorary degree from the Faculty of Architecture at the Second University of Naples for his contributions in the academic, economic, and industrial spheres.
