= Carlo Scarpa =

Italian architect and designer (1906–1978)

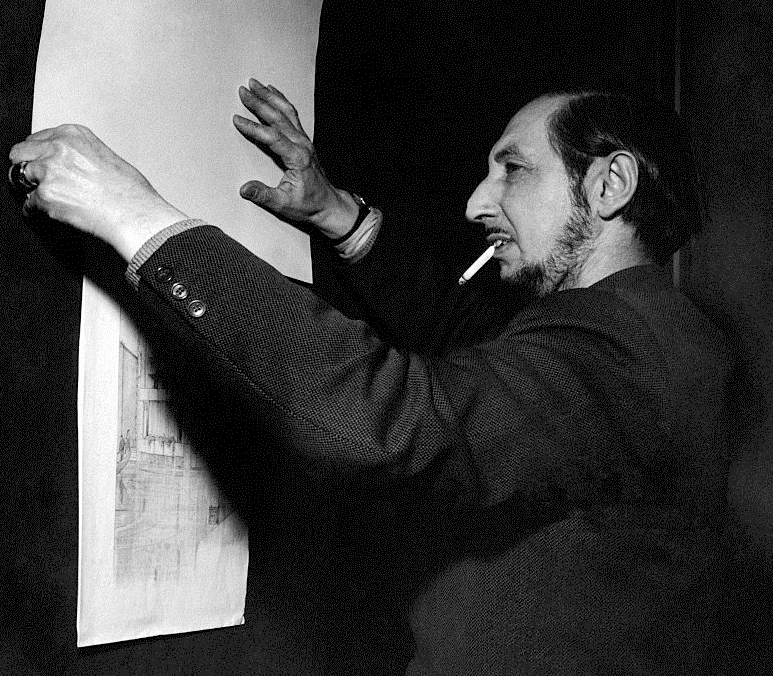
- Scarpa studying the drawings of Frank Lloyd Wright in Venice (1954)
- Born: 2 June 1906
- Died: 28 November 1978 (aged 72)
- Occupation: Architect, designer, glass artist
- Children: Tobia Scarpa
- Awards: honorary Royal Designer for Industry (1969)

Carlo Scarpa (2 June 1906 – 28 November 1978) was an Italian architect and designer. He was influenced by the materials, landscape, and history of Venetian culture, as well as those of Japan. Scarpa translated his interests in history, regionalism, invention, and techniques of artistry and craftsmanship into glass and furniture design.

== Biography ==
Scarpa was born in Venice on 2 June 1906. Much of his early childhood was spent in Vicenza, where his family relocated when he was two years old. After his mother's death when he was 13, he moved with his father and brother back to Venice. Carlo attended the Academy of Fine Arts, where he focused on architectural studies. After graduating from the academy with the title of Professor of Architecture, he apprenticed with the architect Francesco Rinaldo. Scarpa married Rinaldo's niece, Nini Lazzari (Onorina Lazzari).

However, due to his refusal to sit the pro forma architecture licensing exam administered by the Italian government, he was not permitted to use the professional title "Architetto" or practice architecture without associating with a licensed architect. Clients, associates, and artisans sometimes referred to him as "Professore".

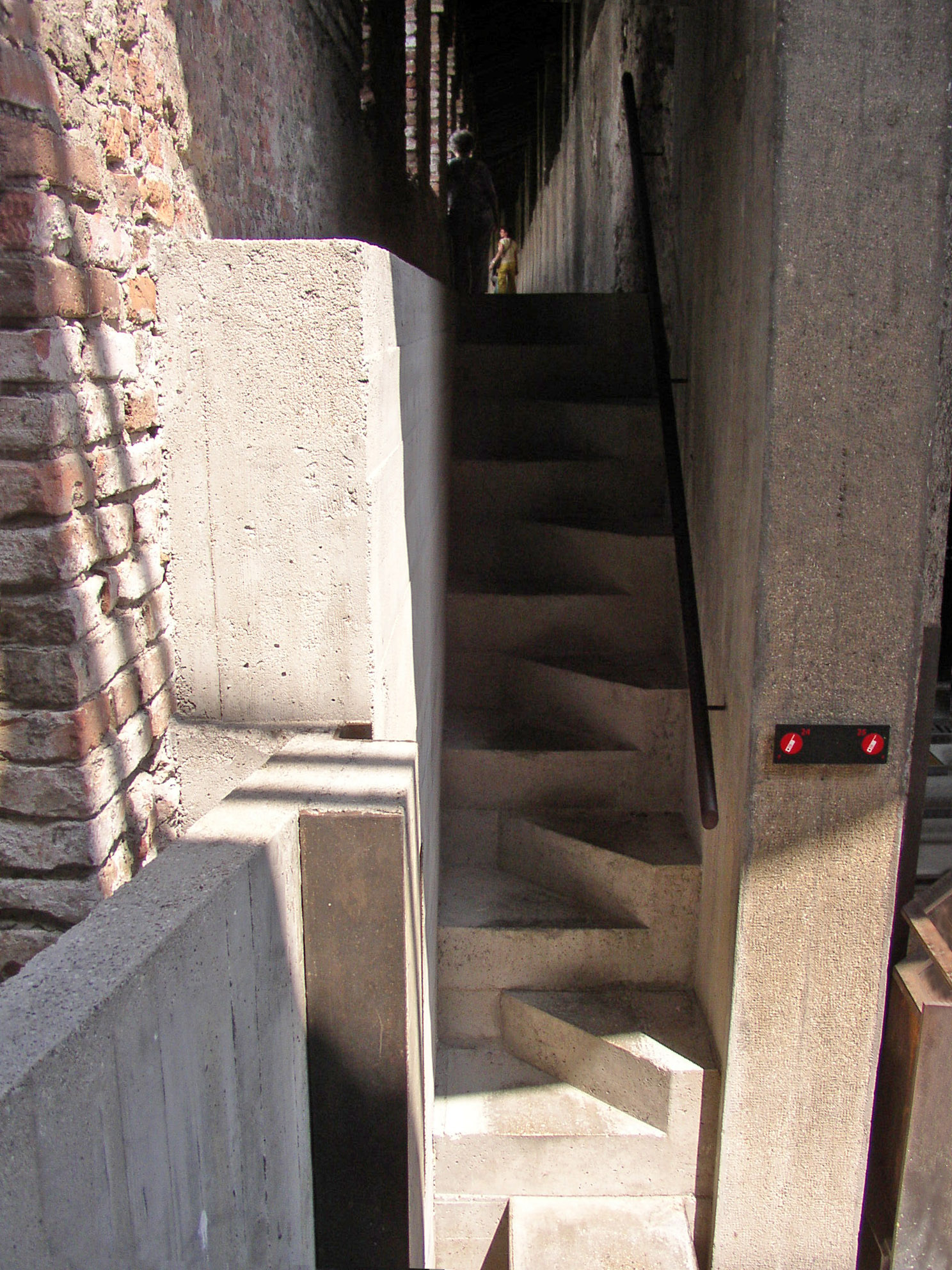
Castelvecchio Museum stairs by Scarpa

Scarpa taught drawing and interior decoration at the Istituto universitario di architettura di Venezia from the late 1940s until his death. Scarpa was Mario Botta's thesis adviser along with Giuseppe Mazzariol; the latter was the director of the Fondazione Querini Stampalia when Scarpa completed his renovation and garden for that institution.

While most of his built work is located in the Veneto region, he designed landscapes, gardens, and buildings for other regions of Italy as well as Canada, the United States, Saudi Arabia, France, and Switzerland. His name has 11 letters and this number is used repeatedly in his architecture.

In 1978, while in Sendai, Japan, Scarpa fell down a flight of concrete stairs. He died of his injuries on 28 November 1978 after ten days in hospital. He was buried standing up and wrapped in linen sheets in the style of a medieval knight, in an isolated exterior corner of the L-shaped Brion tomb designed by him in Altivole.

One of his last projects, the Villa Palazzetto in Monselice, was left incomplete at the time of his death, and was altered in October 2006 by his son, Tobia Scarpa. Considered one of his most ambitious landscape and garden projects, it was executed for Aldo Businaro, the representative for Cassina who was responsible for Scarpa's first trip to Japan. Businaro died in August 2006, a few months before the completion of the new stairs at the Villa Palazzetto, which were built to commemorate Scarpa's centenary.

In 1984, the Italian composer Luigi Nono dedicated a composition for orchestra to Scarpa in micro-intervals, A Carlo Scarpa, Architetto, Ai suoi infiniti possibili.

== Design career ==
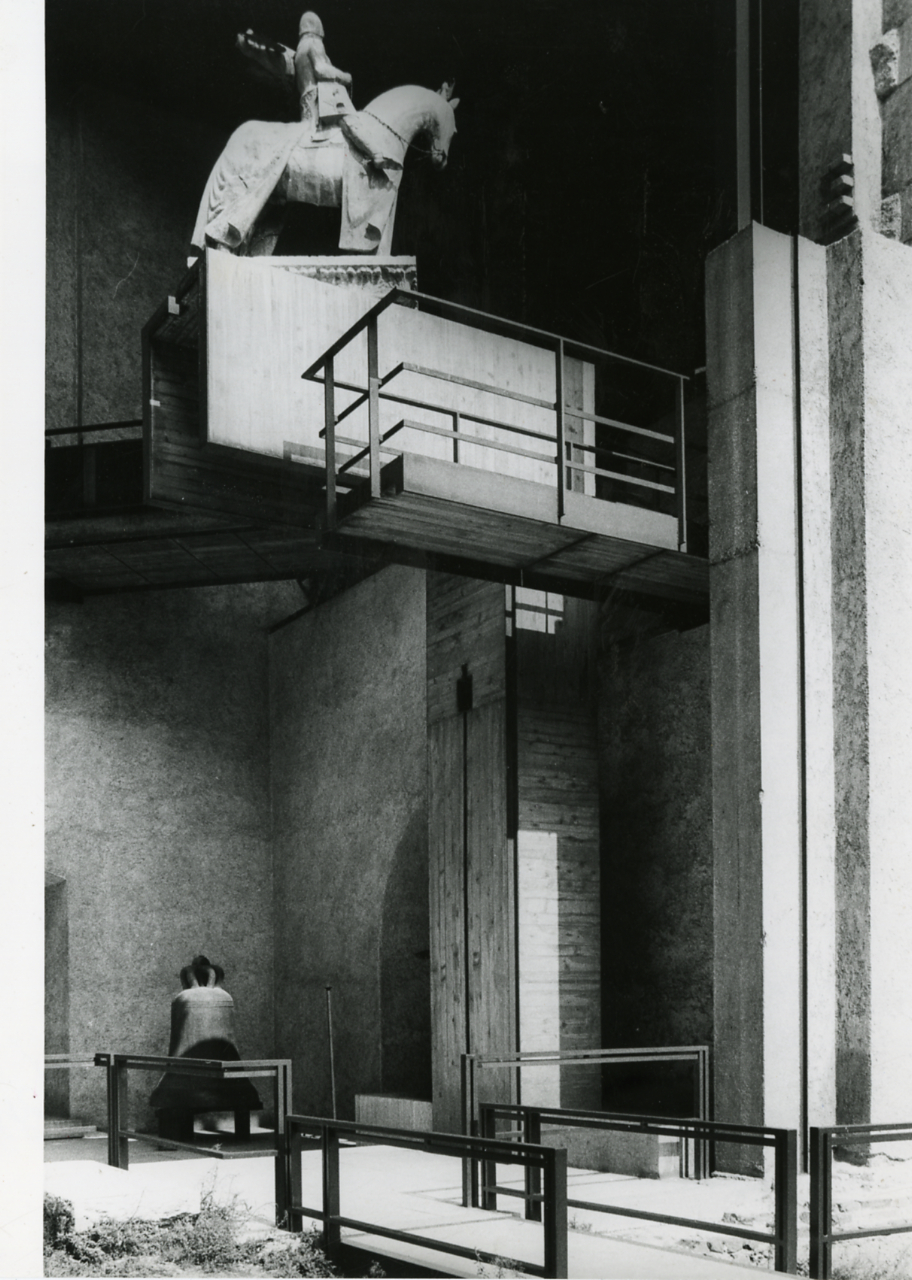
Museo di Castelvecchio in Verona. Photo by Paolo Monti, 1982 (Fondo Paolo Monti, BEIC).

Scarpa was a designer as well as an architect. At the beginning of his career, he collaborated with glassmakers in Murano. He designed jars and chandeliers for MVM Cappellin & Co. and Venini. His designs for Venini have sold for high prices at auction, including a 1940 vase that sold at Christie's in 2012 for around $309,000, and another vase, found in a thrift store, which sold for $107,100 in 2023.

In 2013, the Metropolitan Museum of Art exhibited Venetian Glass by Carlo Scarpa: The Venini Company, 1932–1947, featuring the designs and techniques he created for the Venini factory. “Their collaboration was put on display at important international showcases such as the Milan Triennale and Venice Biennale in Italy during the 1930s and 1940s.”

The exhibition was reviewed by critic and curator William Warmus in Glass Quarterly in 2013 who wrote that "The exhibition originated in Venice, curated by Marino Barovier, and was brought to the Metropolitan Museum by Sheena Wagstaff, Chair of Modern and Contemporary Art, and curated by Nicholas Cullinan, who is a big fan of Scarpa’s architecture. It occupies the entire ground floor of the octagonal shape Lehmann wing...As we look at the objects in this show, we need to ask ourselves: what did Scarpa want to say to us? My impression is that Scarpa was there to calm the waters of Venetian excess, to take the Venini culture and add to it by subtracting from it, if you will. He was also there to honor tradition. Thoughtful curatorial alignments help guide and focus us so we can see these traits.For example, a long case displays a group of Scarpa fused mosaic (murine) vessels, and another nearby shows ancient Roman murrines, a legacy from the past that influenced Scarpa." The full article is available here: https://www.warmus.org/carlo-scarpa.

Scarpa also joined the industrial design world in the 1960s after meeting Dino Gavina. Scarpa became the president of the eponymous company, Gavina. The Doge table (1968) and the Cornaro sofa (1973) are his most famous.

== Notable works ==
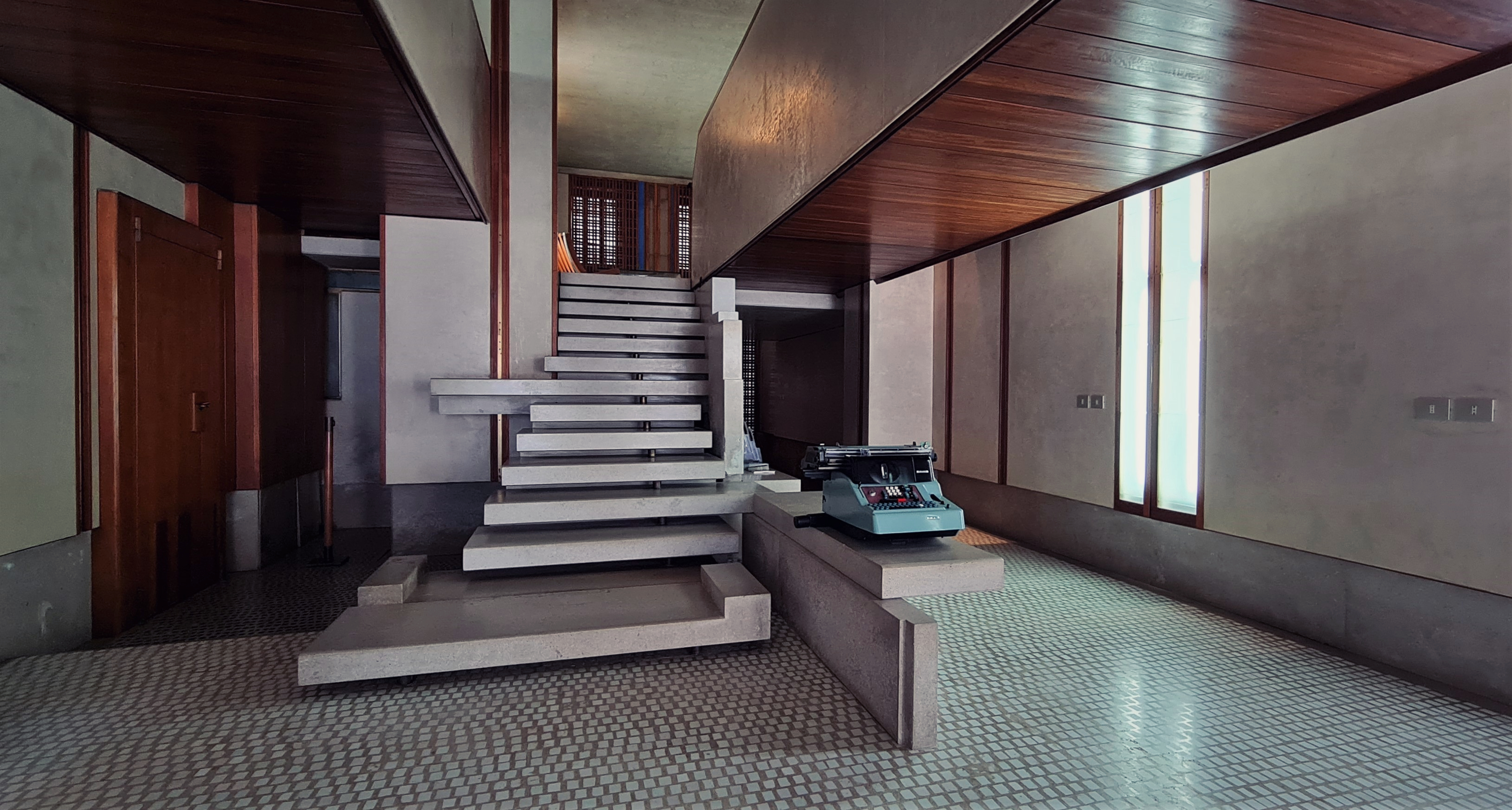
Olivetti on St Mark's Square, Venice

- Gallerie dell'Accademia, Venice, Italy
- Padiglione del libro d'arte, Giardini di Castello, La Biennale, Venice, 1950–1952
- Palazzo Abatellis: La Galleria Di Sicilia, Palermo, 1953–1954
- Palazzo Ca'Foscari, Venice, Italy, 1935–1956
- Venezuelan Pavilion, La Biennale, Venice, Italy, 1954–1956
- Veritti House, Udine, Italy, 1955–1961
- Museo Canova di Possagno, Italy, 1955–1957
- Museo di Castelvecchio, Verona, Italy, 1956–1964
- Negozio Olivetti, piazza S. Marco, Venezia, Italy, 1957–1958
- Ex Negozio Gavina, Bologna, 1962
- Fondazione Querini Stampalia, Venice, 1961–1963
- Casa Tabarelli, Cornaiano Girlan,1968
- Brion Tomb and Sanctuary, at San Vito d'Altivole, Italy, 1969–1978
- Banca Popolare di Verona, Italy, 1973–1978
- Villa Ottolehngi, Verona, 1974–1978
- Restauración del Museo de Castelvecchio en Verona / Carlo Scarpa

== Bibliography ==
- Beltramini, Guido; Zannier, Italo (13 February 2007). Carlo Scarpa. New York: Rizzoli Publications. ISBN 978-0-8478-2911-8.
- Crippa, Maria Antonietta. (1986). Loffi Randolin, Marina (ed.). "Carlo Scarpa: Theory, Design, Projects". Cambridge, Massachusetts: MIT Press.
- Dal Co, Francesco; Mazzariol, Giuseppe (1984). "Carlo Scarpa: opera completa". Getty Search Gateway (in Italian). Milan: Electa.
- Scarpa, Carlo; Co, Francesco Dal; Mazzariol, Giuseppe (1985). Carlo Scarpa. New York, NY: Rizzoli International Publications. ISBN 978-0-8478-0686-7.
- Co, Francesco Dal (2009). To Construct, to Compose. ISBN 978-90-8506-560-9.
- Guidi, Guido; Frongia, Antonello (2011). Carlo Scarpa's Tomba Brion. Ostfildern: Hatje Cantz. ISBN 978-3-7757-2624-5.
- Giunta, Santo (2020). Carlo Scarpa. A (curious) Shaft of Light, a Golden Gonfalon, the Hands and a Face of a Women. Reflections on the Design Process and Layout of Palazzo Abatellis 1953-1954. Ediz. a Colori. Venezia: Marsilio. ISBN 978-88-297-0654-9.
- Los, Sergio (1967). "Carlo Scarpa, architetto poeta". Getty Search Gateway (in Italian). London: RIBA.
- Los, Sergio (1995). "Carlo Scarpa : guida all'architettura" (in Italian). Venice: Arsenale.
- Los, Sergio (2009). Carlo Scarpa: 1906–1978: A Poet of Architecture. Taschen. ISBN 978-3-8228-2112-1.
- McCarter, Robert (2013). Carlo Scarpa. London: Phaidon Press. (2nd edition, 2017)
- Olsberg, Nicholas; Ranalli, George; Polano, Sergio; Di Lietio, Alba; Freidman, Mildred; Bedard, Jean-Francois; Guidi, Guido (1999). Carlo Scarpa, Architect: Intervening with History (1st ed.). New York: Monacelli Press. p. 256. ISBN 978-1-58093-035-2.
- Schultz, Anne-Catrin (9 October 2007). Carlo Scarpa--Layers. Stuttgart: Edition Axel Menges. ISBN 978-3-930698-14-1.
- Semi, Franca (2010). A Lezione con Carlo Scarpa (in Italian). Venice: Cicero. ISBN 978-88-89632-26-0.
- Sonego, Carla (1995). Carlo Scarpa. Gli anni della formazione. Venice: IUAV, (unpublished thesis, Professor Marco De Michelis, supervisor). (in Italian)
