= Flores & Prats =

Architectural practice in Barcelona, Spain

Flores & Prats is an architectural practice based in Barcelona, Spain, founded by Eva Prats and Ricardo Flores in 1998.

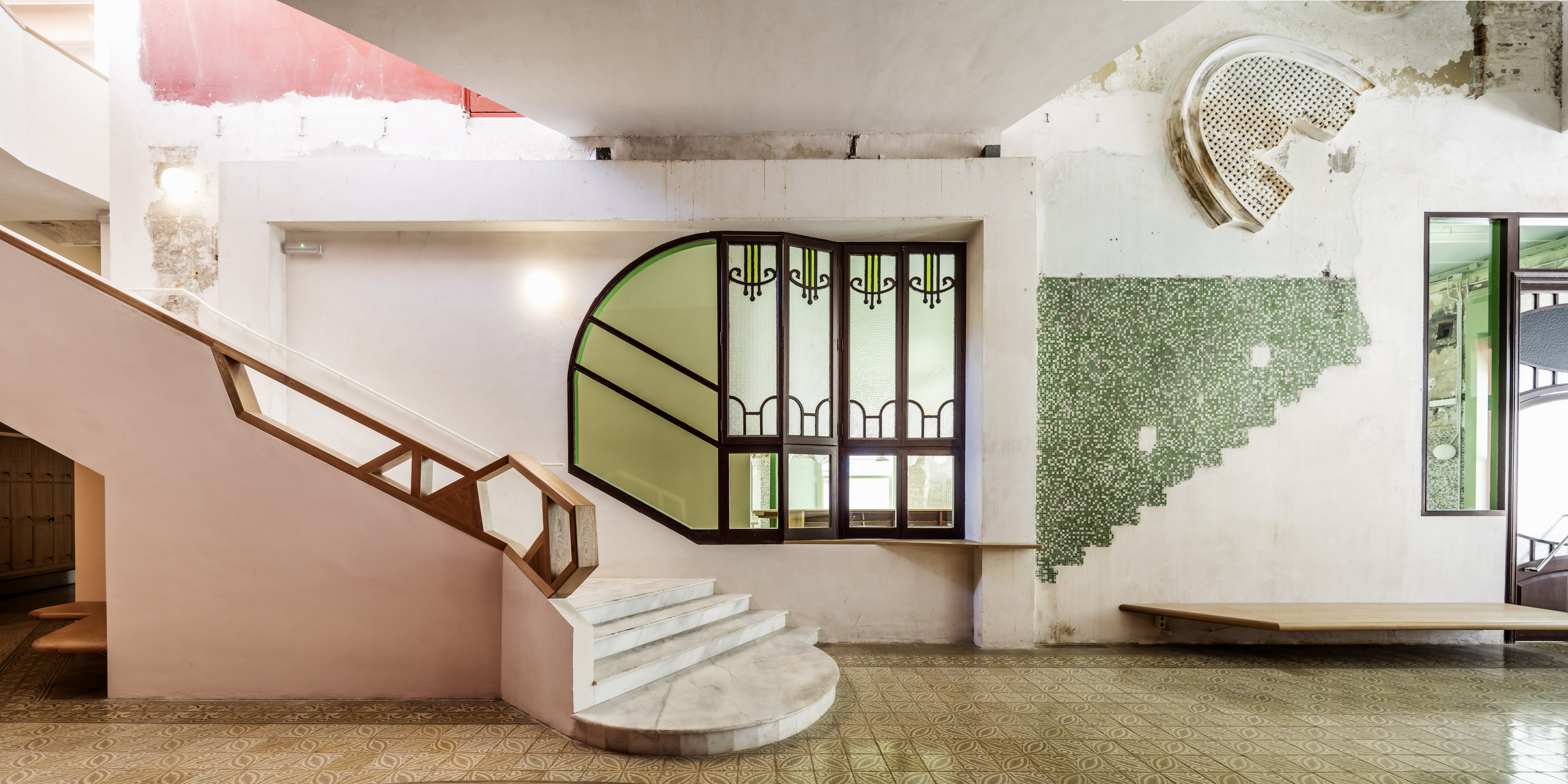
Sala Beckett, the cultural space designed by Flores & Prats Architects in Barcelona

== History ==
Established in 1998 by Eva Prats and Ricardo Flores, after their experience at Enric Miralles’s office, Flores & Prats combines design and constructive practice with academic activity.

In 2017 Flores & Prats were finalists for the FAD Architecture Prize, ENOR Architecture Prize, and Beazley Designs of the Year at the Design Museum in London. They received a special mention in the National Architecture awards for Spain in 2018 and been named Architects of the Year in the 2018 AD Awards.

== Principals ==
Born in Buenos Aires in 1965, Ricardo Flores is the founder of Flores & Prats with Eva Prats. He studied architecture at Universidad de Buenos Aires, Facultad de Arquitectura, Diseño y Urbanismo. In Buenos Aires he collaborated with various architecture firms, such as Aslan y Ezcurra and Baudizzone - Lestard - Varas Arquitectos. with a thesis titled "Interstitial Spaces". He collaborated with Solà Morales's studio for the exhibition project "Alexanderpolder, New Urban Frontiers" held at the Kunsthal in Rotterdam in 1993. From 1993 to 1998 he collaborated as Design Architect at Enric Miralles's office. He completed a PhD in architecture at ETSAB in 2016 with his thesis "Casa La Ricarda by Antonio Bonet Castellana". Ricardo has been professor of Design Studio at the School of Architecture of the Universitat International (Esarq-UIC) since 2004 until 2012, and since 2009 he is Associate Professor of Design Studio at ETSAB - Escola Tècnica Superior d'Arquitectura de Barcelona.

Eva Prats was born in Barcelona in 1965. She studied architecture at the ETSAB, where she graduated in 1992. Since 1986 she collaborated with Enric Miralles. In 1993, Eva Prats participated the EUROPAN III International Housing Competition, starting her own practice in 1994. In 1998 she established Flores & Prats with Ricardo Flores. In March 2019 she completed her PhD at RMIT University with a dissertation titled "To Observe with the Client, to Draw with the Existing. Three cases of architecture dealing with the As Found", directed by Jo Van Den Berghe, Leon van Shaik and Martyn Hook. She is Associate Professor of Design Studio at ETSAB since 2002. Since 2014 she is also Professor of Architecture and Urbanism – Industry Fellow at the RMIT – Royal Melbourne Institute of Technology.

== Projects ==
Selected works by the firm include:

- The Morning Chapel. One of the 10 chapels constructed for the Vatican Pavilion curated by Francesco Dal Co, the first contribution of the Holy See to the Venice Architecture Biennale in 2018. The 10 chapels were built on the Island of San Giorgio Maggiore in Venice.
- New Sala Beckett, Obrador Internacional de Dramatúrgia. The project consists in the adaptive reuse of a former workers’ club in Barcelona, to house the theatre activities of Sala Beckett, with exhibition activities and school of drama. The project obtained a special mention at the Spanish Architecture Awards 2017, finalist at the ENOR Awards 2017, FAD National Architecture Award 2017,Beazley Designs of the Year at the Design Museum in London, nominated for the EU Prize for Contemporary Architecture - Mies van der Rohe Award 2017, winner of Barcelona City Prize 2016 in Architecture and Living Spaces - Simon Prize of Architecture 2016. In The Architectural Review, Douglas Murphy wrote about Sala Beckett: "built within, through and around an existing structure in Poblenou neighbourhood of Barcelona, it boasts a subtle yet virtuosic gamut of spatial effects in its transformations of the existing material". And in an article published in ICON magazine, he commented this project, saying "the Catalan duo’s visually complex, finely detailed buildings stem from a passion for the act of building and a constant engagement with the role of history in public space".
- Casal Balaguer. The project, made in collaboration with Duch-Pizá Arquitectos, consists in the rehabilitation of a baroque Palace in Palma de Mallorca as an exhibition and cultural centre, plus the organization of workshops for the arts association "Círculo de Bellas Artes". The project was nominated for the European Union Prize for Contemporary Architecture - Mies van der Rohe Award in 2015 and selected at the Argentina Architecture Biennial 2016, finalist at the 2016 FAD Awards.
- Innovation Campus Microsoft Italia. The project, completed in 2011, consists in the access canopy, new facade and landscape areas for the new headquarters of Microsoft in Peschiera Borromeo, Milan. It was awarded First Prize in the 2011 International Award Dedalo-Minosse in Vicenza.
- Edificio 111. The new building for 111 social houses in Terrassa, Barcelona, explores and experiments with the idea of promoting communication, relationships and familiarity so that the neighbourhood can act as the core social structure within society, reverting the tendency toward isolation and individuality. Edificio 111 was finalist at the AVS Award for Social Housing in Catalonia (2011-2013 edition), awarded at the Bienal d’Arquitectura del Vallès 2009–10, selected at the Spanish Architecture Bienal 2011, finalist at the 2011 FAD Awards, and finalist at the European Awards Ugo Rivolta 2011.
- YUTE’S Warehouse. The project, completed in 2005, consists in the rehabilitation and extension of a former industrial building as the offices and warehouse for a textile company. Located in Sant Just Desvern, Barcelona, the project was shortlisted for the FAD Architecture Prize in 2005 and participated in the UNAUFGERÄUMT / AS FOUND exhibition, hosted at the Swiss Architecture Museum in Basel in 2007.

== Exhibitions ==
- What Where: Crossing boundaries in the architecture of Sala Beckett exhibition, curated by Vicky Richardson, explored how the work of Irish playwright Samuel Beckett influenced the design of an experimental theatre in Barcelona. The exhibition was on display at Roca Gallery in London from June 1 to August 31, 2019. Catherine Slessor for The Guardian wrote: "With a penchant for layering styles and materials from different eras, the Catalan duo practise a kind of architectural bricolage – the notion might seem cliched, but has its origins in the French bricoler, "to tinker". Choreographing a chimerical new spectacle through scavenging and reworking, Flores & Prats are superbly seductive bricoleurs."
- Double exhibition in Copenhagen in 2013: Meeting at the Building at Kunstakademiets Arkitektskole and Ingredients & Cakes at the Leth & Gori gallery. The exhibition at Leth & Gori saw the collaboration of Flores & Prats with British artist Soraya Smithson, who designed the window-shop and the Biscuit-Copenhagen Map that forms the cover of the catalogue. Flores & Prats collaborated again with Soraya Smithson in 2017, when they commissioned her to make a paper theatre model to celebrate the conclusion of their project to transform a building in Barcelona into the Sala Beckett Obrador Internacional de Dramatúrgia.
- 111 mirades creuades. La dimensió social de l’habitatge (111 Crossed Views. The Social Dimension of Housing). Monographic exhibition on 111 Building at Espai Picasso of COAC in Barcelona. April 11 to May 12, 2011.
- The 240th Royal Academy of Arts Summer Exhibition. Collective exhibition where the project Mills Museum of Mallorca is shown. London, 9 June to 17 August 2008.
- UNAUFGERÄUMT / AS FOUND exhibition, hosted at the Swiss Architecture Museum in Basel in 2007, examined architectural designs and strategies for found situations and existing buildings.

Flores & Prats Architects’ participations in La Biennale di Venezia:

- 14th International Architecture Exhibition - La Biennale di Venezia (2014). Flores & Prats participated in the Grafting Architecture. Catalonia at Venice exhibition in the Catalan Pavilion (Official Collateral Events programme) promoted by Institut Ramon Llull and curated by Josep Torrents with the project for Casal Balaguer, designed with Duch-Pizá Arquitectos.
- 15th International Architecture Exhibition - La Biennale di Venezia (2016). Flores & Prats participated in the Unfinished exhibition in the Spanish Pavilion, curated by Iñaqui Carnicero and Carlos Quintans with the project for Casal Balaguer, designed with Duch-Pizá Arquitectos. The Spanish Pavilion won Golden Lion for Best National Pavilion at Venice Biennale of Architecture 2016.
- 16th International Architecture Exhibition - La Biennale di Venezia (2018). Flores & Prats were featured in the main exhibition, titled "FREESPACE", curated by Yvonne Farrell and Shelley McNamara with Liquid Light, a partial replica at 1:1 scale of Sala Beckett. Flores & Prats were also among the ten architects selected for the Vatican Pavilion curated by Francesco Dal Co, on the Island of San Giorgio Maggiore where they presented the "Morning Chapel".

== Awards ==
The work of Flores & Prats has been awarded internationally. They have been part of the Emerging Offices Wallpaper* Directory in 2007. They won the Grand Prize for the Best Architectural Work of the Royal Academy of Arts in London 2008 for the rehabilitation project Mills Museum in Palma de Mallorca, which was also recipient for the Mallorca Architecture Award. Flores & Prats were nominated for the International Prize Dedalo Minosse in Vicenza in 2011 for the New Microsoft Campus in Milan. They have been nominated for the European Union Prize for Contemporary Architecture - Mies van der Rohe Award three times: first in 2005 for the Mills Museum of the Balearic Islands, then in 2015 for Casal Balaguer and in 2017 for Sala Beckett. Their work was exhibited at La Biennale di Venezia - International Architecture Exhibition in 2014, 2016 and 2018.

Casal Balaguer was nominated for the European Union Prize for Contemporary Architecture - Mies van der Rohe Award in 2015 and was finalist in the Mallorca Architecture Awards in the Rehabilitation Category in 2017, and awarded the City of Palma Prize of Architecture in 2018.

Sala Beckett / International Drama Workshop was finalist at the FAD Architecture Prize, ENOR Architecture Prize, and Beazley Designs of the Year at the Design Museum in London, nominated for the EU Prize for Contemporary Architecture - Mies van der Rohe Award 2017, winner of Barcelona City Prize 2016 in Architecture and Living Spaces - Simon Prize of Architecture 2016. They have received a special mention in the National Architecture awards for Spain in 2018 and been named Architects of the Year in the 2018 AD Awards.

== Publications ==
- Thought by hand / Pensado a mano. The architecture of Flores & Prats, edited by Arquine (Mexico, 2014), with writings by Miquel Adrià, Manuel de Solá-Morales, Toni Casares and Antoni Miralda, and a critical essay by Juan José Lahuerta. The book collects works in different fields such as rehabilitation, social housing, public space, neighbor's participation and university workshops. The book reflects the essence of the studio by displaying their design processes that range from sketches and drawings to detailed models.
- ARCHIVES: Flores & Prats - Journal of Architecture - Issue 1, edited by C2C (Spain, April 2017) with an interview by Carlos Quintáns to Ricardo Flores and Eva Prats, and a conversation with artist Antoni Miralda. First issue of a publishing project on the fields of architecture, contemporary art and design, the book is dedicated to the work of Flores & Prats and includes a selection of works by the architecture firm.
