= Francesco Pio Dotti =

Italian architect, painter and designer (born 1956)

Francesco Pio Dotti (born 17 February 1956) is an Italian architect, painter, designer and writer in the school of Aldo Rossi.

He obtained his Master's degree in 1972 from Iuav University in Venice. After working for various Paduan architecture studios, he opened his own architecture and design studio in 1985.

In 1995, he wrote Architettura Religiosa Francescana: Il "Luogo" di S. Antonio a Camposampiero. In 2011 with his son, Jacopo Dotti, he founded Revolux Studios, whose interests include architectural projects and restoration to multimedia communication and design. In 2012 some of his drawings were acquired by the Centre Pompidou in Paris and were part of the international architectural exhibition La Tendenza: Architectures Italiennes 1965–1985.
