= Università Iuav di Venezia =

Architecture school in Venice, Italy

Iuav University of Venice
- Università Iuav di Venezia
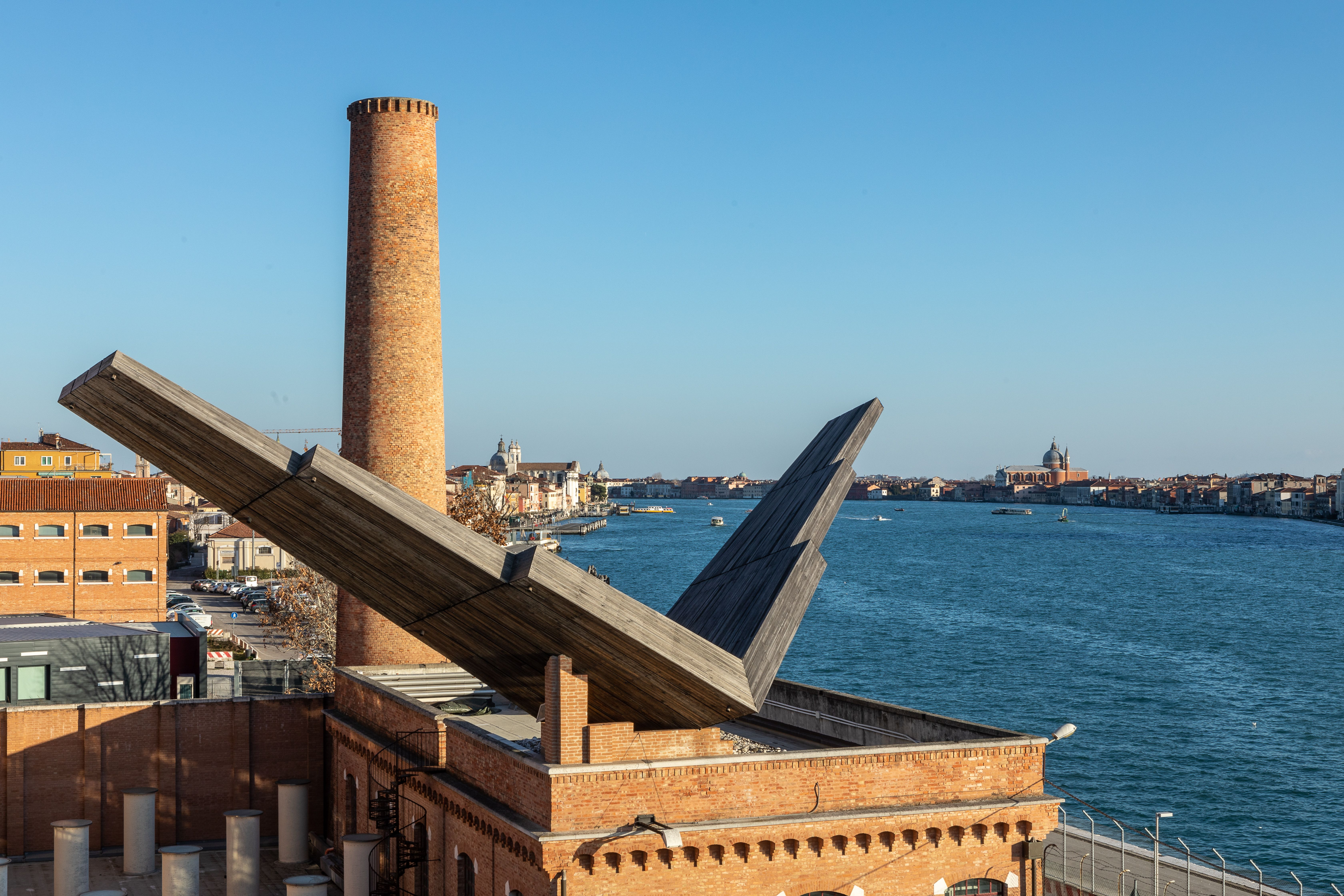
- Motto: Firmitas, Utilitas, Venustas
- Motto in English: Strength, Functionality, Beauty
- Type: State-supported
- Established: 1926; 100 years ago
- Affiliations: EAAE, EUA, CTBUH, VIU, Michelangelo Foundation
- Rector: Benno Albrecht
- Academic staff: 526
- Administrative staff: 250
- Students: 4997
- Location: Venice, Italy; 45.4331°N 12.3149°E
- Colors: IUAV
- Website: www.iuav.it

Iuav University of Venice (Italian: Università Iuav di Venezia) is a university in Venice, Italy. It was founded in 1926 as the Istituto Universitario di Architettura di Venezia as one of the first architecture schools in Italy. The university offers several undergraduate, graduate and higher education courses in architecture, urban planning, fashion, arts, and design.

It is a design-themed university focusing on the teaching, research, and practice of the design of living spaces and environments (buildings, cities, landscapes and territory) and in the design of everyday use objects, of fashion and of graphics. It has also a more recent courses in visual arts, theatre and performing arts, and multimedia events.

== History ==
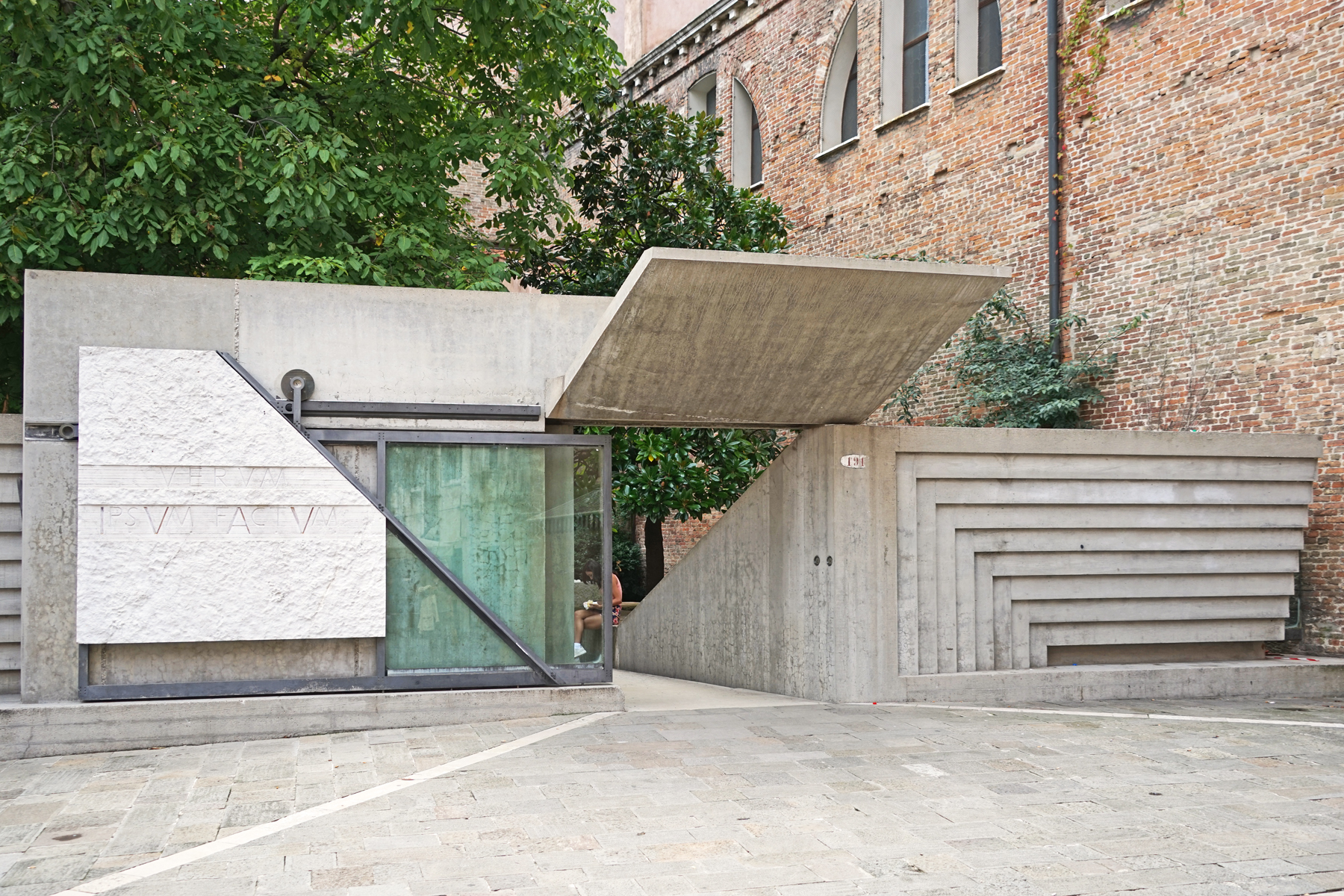
Main Gate of the Tolentini building headquarters of Università Iuav di Venezia (Iuav university of Venice) designed by Carlo Scarpa

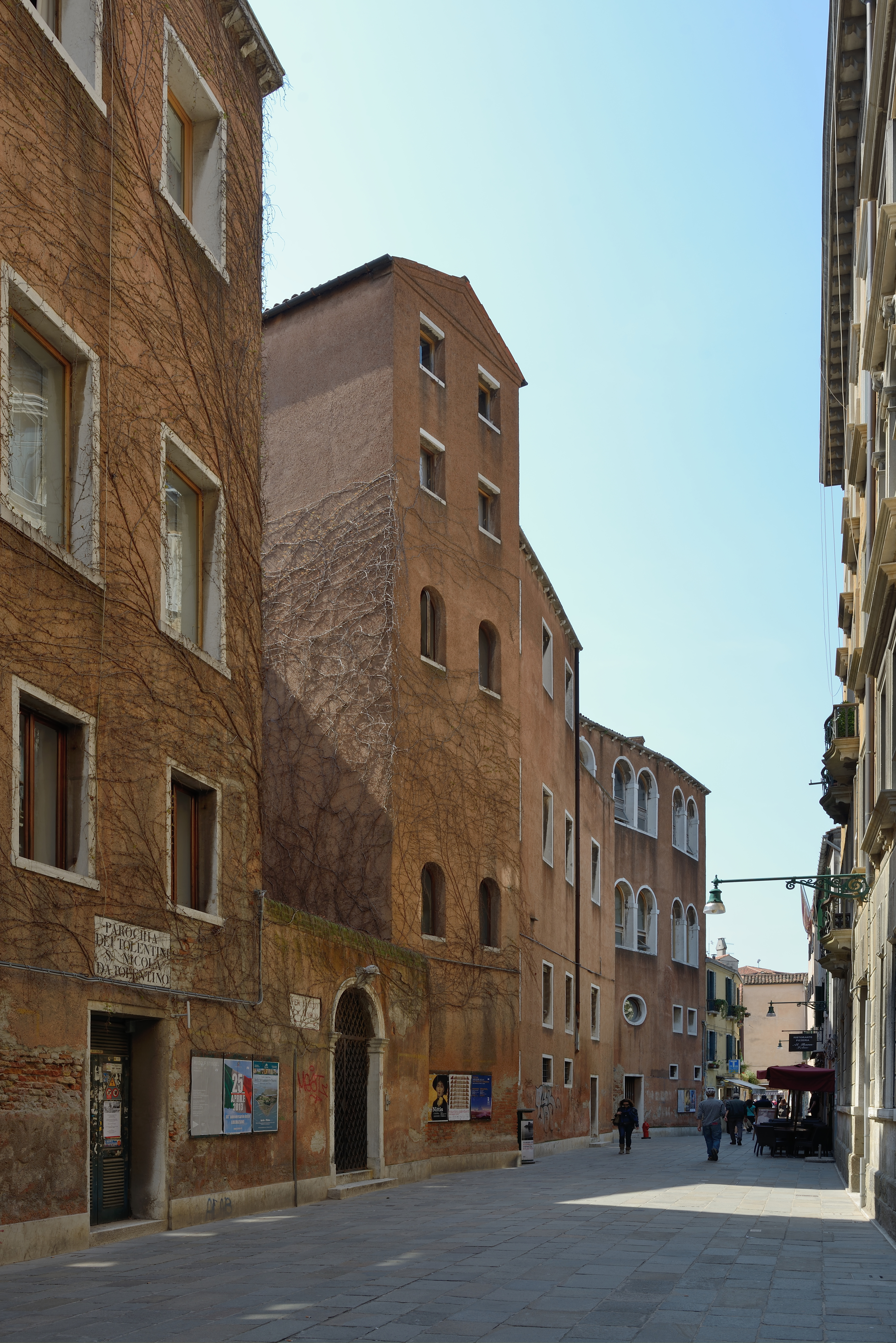
Faculty of Architecture and Headquarters of Università Iuav di Venezia in Calle Amai S. Croce

In 1926 Giovanni Bordiga and Guido Cirilli founded the Scuola Superiore di Arti, a branch of the Accademia di Belle Arti di Venezia. It was the second architecture school in Italy after that of Rome. In 1940 The Istituto Universitario di Architettura di Venezia was founded. In the year 1963-64 Iuav moved to Tolentini with 1000 students enrolled and later in 1970 Giovanni Astengo coordinates Italy's first course in Urban Planning in Preganziol, but University reform in 1981 as the Urban Planning becomes a degree programme at Ca' Tron. By the beginning of the 90s, particularly in the year 1993 12,000 students were enrolled in 3 degree programmes (Urban and Regional Planning, History and Conservation of Cultural Heritage, and Architecture).

By the academic year 2000/2001 the Institute became a university with 3 faculties:

- Architecture
- Regional Planning
- Arts and Design

and in 2013 three new departments were opened:

- Department of Architecture, Construction and Conservation
- Department of Architecture and Arts
- Department of Design and Planning in Complex Environments

In the academic year 2001/2002, in parallel with the 75th anniversary, the Istituto Universitario di Architettura di Venezia (Iuav) officially changed its name to Università Iuav di Venezia and while the four letters of "Iuav" were no longer an acronym, the university decided to retain the abbreviations and use it as the university's name.

In 2002, the Iuav organized an international competition "newlogo Iuav" for the design of the new institutional logo of the university. Internationally known designers, specialized in the design of brands and logos were invited to participate in the competition, seven of the ten graphic designers selected have joined the competition. The jury, composed of Giovanni Anceschi, Enrico Camplani, Marino Folin, Bob Norda, Sergio Polano, Leonardo Sonnoli, Pierpaolo Vetta, chose the logo designed by the French graphic designer Philippe Apeloig, rather than designing an abstract symbol or a figure based on existing motifs, he developed a logo based almost entirely on the four letters I, U, A, and V, arranged vertically, a simple but richly connoted design that aims to represent past, present and future. The new logo replaces the historic seal with the effigy of the lion of St. Mark, redesigned by Massimo Scolari, who for years had been the symbol of the Iuav.

The old Logo – seal and coat of arms – of the University consisted of the frontal image, closed in circular field, of the winged Lion of Saint Mark regent the open gospel with the inscription "Pax tibi Marce Evangelista mei", the idea was not exclusive to Iuav and was used by other Venetian institutions. What distinguished the version of Iuav university were the two circular crowns bearing the words "University Institute of Architecture of Venice" and "Firmitas, Utilitas, Venustas" words used by Vitruvius which was one of the early definitions of architecture, but the addition of two new faculties and the consequent transformation of the university from Istituto Universitario to Università Iuav Università degli Studi, già IUAV (which has changed to Università Iuav di Venezia) made it possible to change the logo because the Iuav was no longer the Istituto Universitario and the Vitruvius's definition of architecture is no longer sufficient to represent the other two faculties that today with the faculty of Architecture make up the Iuav University.

However, currently the old logo is used as the University Seal to distinguish logo and seal but with one modification of the university name from "University Institute of Architecture of Venice" to "Iuav University of Venice".

Architects as Carlo Scarpa, Giuseppe Samonà, Manfredo Tafuri, Aldo Rossi, Giovanni Astengo, Giancarlo De Carlo, Gino Valle, Michele De Lucchi, Nanda Vigo, Alejandro Aravena, and Egle Renata Trincanato were part of the school's history as students and/or tutors. Notable scholars and professionals like Le Corbusier, Louis Kahn, Frank Lloyd Wright and, more recently, Judith Clark, Richard Serra, and Fabrizio Barozzi have been visiting professors and have taught and tutored students at Iuav through the years.

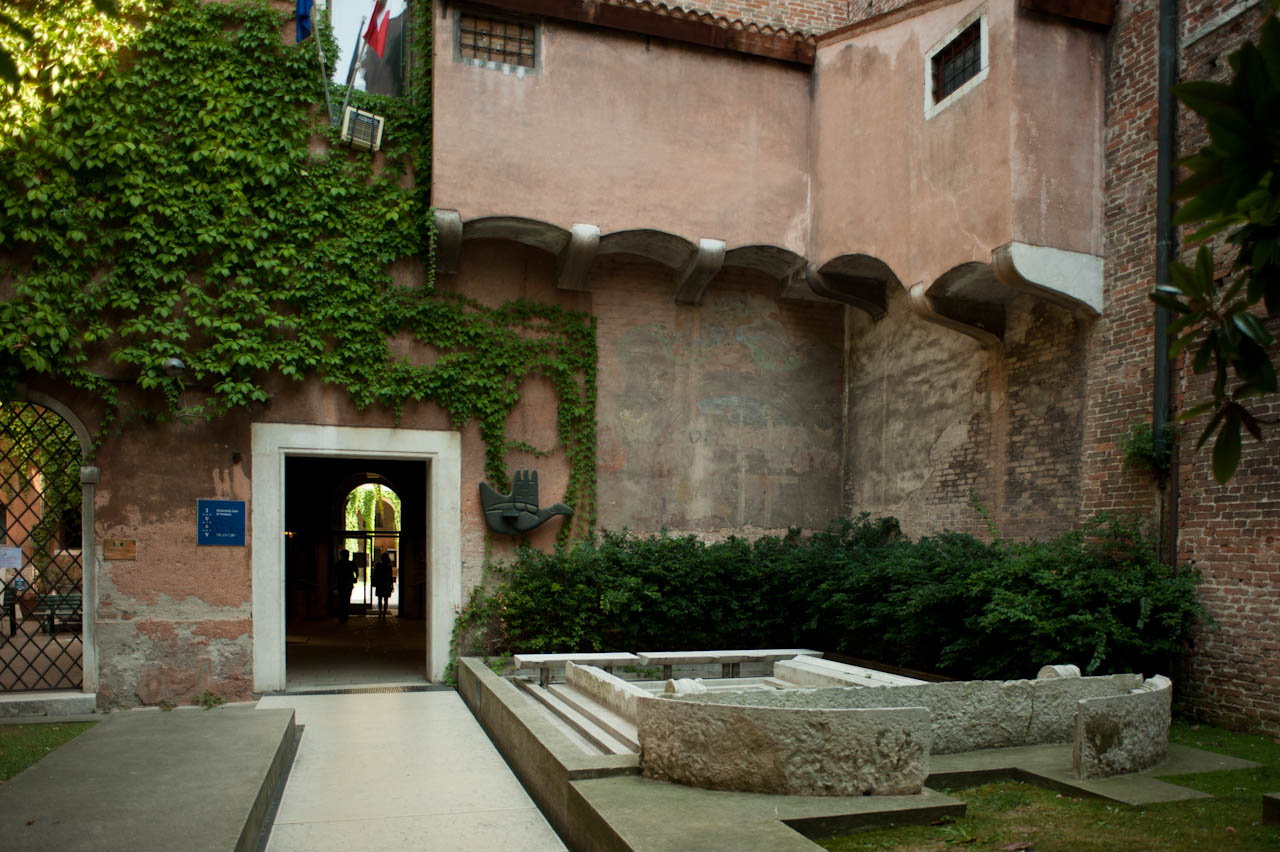
Entrance to the Architectural faculty (Tolentini) of Iuav university of Venice by Carlo Scarpa

== IUAV buildings and locations ==
Tolentini is the Headquarters of Università Iuav di Venezia. The Tolentini building complex is located near Piazzale Roma and comprises the Tolentini church convent complex and a few other neighbouring areas. In 1958, the Italian State, owner of the former convent, gave Iuav access to the building began construction work. The renovations of the whole complex took place between 1960 and 1965, project and work direction by the architect Daniele Calabi and the engineer Mario Bacci. In 1985, the entrance area was transformed according to a project by Carlo Scarpa, work direction by architect Sergio Los, and structural calculation by the engineer Carlo Maschietto.

Palazzo Badoer In 1974, Iuav also bought the palace belonging to the Santa Caterina Sisters of Charity of Nevers. Construction work and adaptation of the palace to Department of Architecture began in April 1978. Palazzo Badoer has been the home to the Iuav School of Doctorate Studies since 2008.

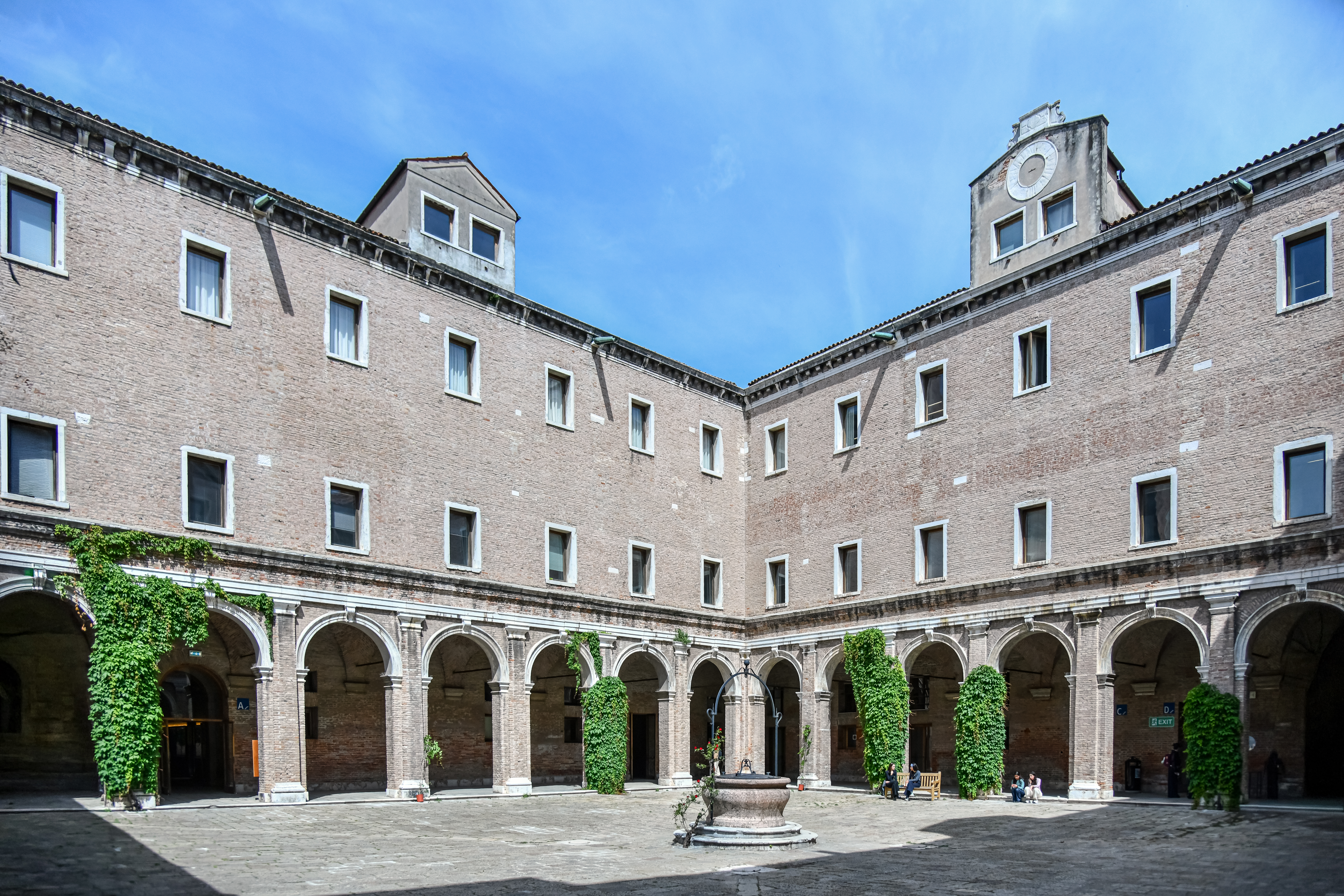
Palazzo Badoer, it has been the home to the Iuav School of Doctorate Studies since 2008.

Cotonificio veneziano History was inaugurated in 1883. In the previous year, a cotton spinning and production company was set up in Venice. Partially destroyed by a fire in 1916, the cotton mill (cotonificio) was rebuilt. About a thousand workers worked here: it remained operative until 1960, and then was abandoned for thirty years before restoration in the 1990s.Restored by the Venetian architecture studio of Gino Valle, the main building now houses an important part of the university: classrooms, the "Gino Valle" exhibit space, the "Archivio Progetti" (which includes a study room with nine consultation seats), the exhibition hall, a main office and a deposit. The exhibition room is permanently set up with an exhibition of models belonging to the collection of the "Archivio", and it hosts temporary exhibits that display original documents from the archive funds. It is now the seat of "Archivio Progetti", ArTec Archives on Techniques and Materials for Architecture and Industrial Design, infrastructure management, auditorium, "Gino Valle" exhibit space, Gradoni room, teaching activities.

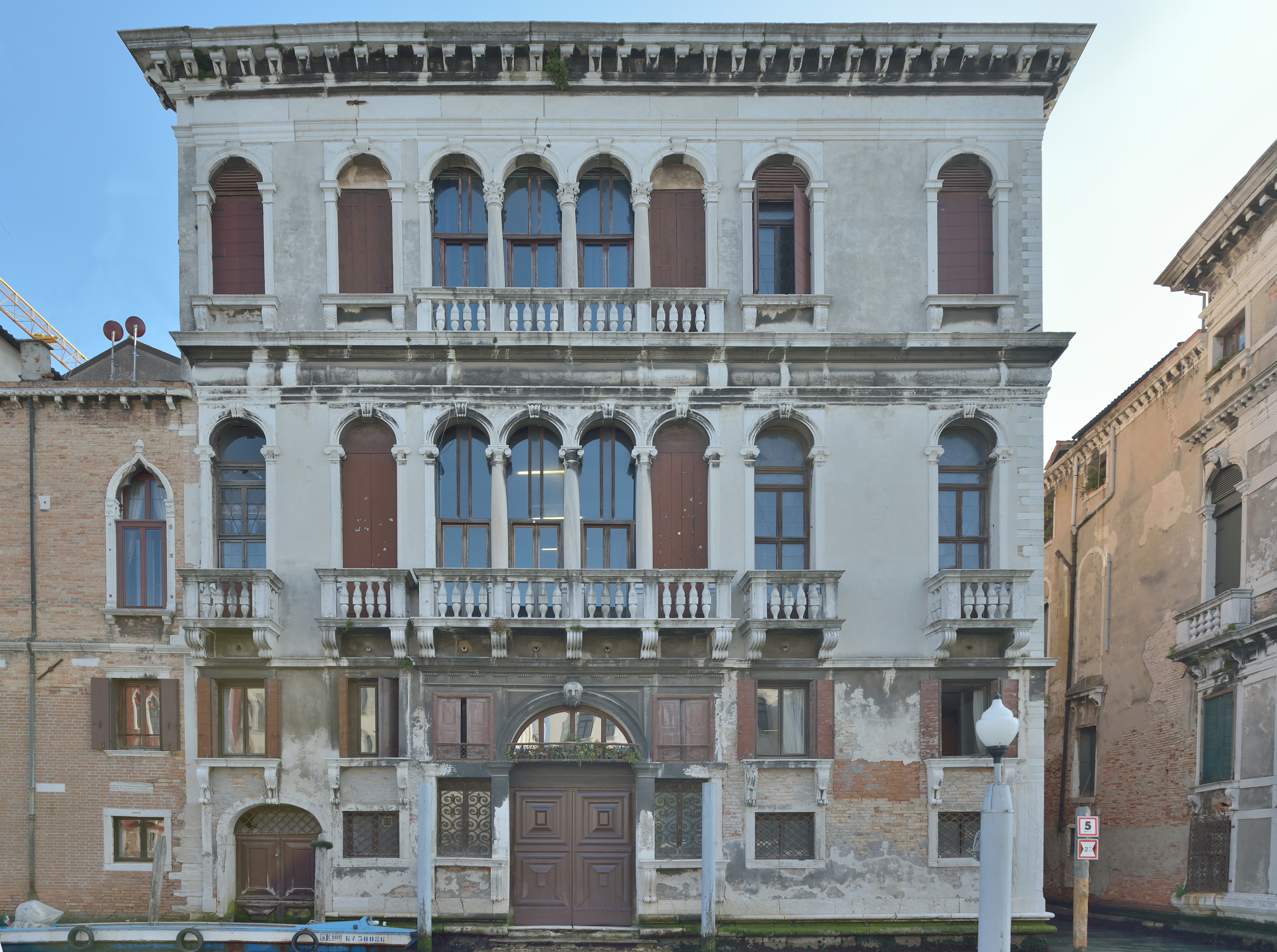
Palazzo Ca' Tron, now an exhibition venue for artistic events, available for both university and external users.

Ca' Tron is the seat of exhibition spaces, and Ir.Ide research infrastructure. Was purchased by Iuav in 1972, and restored on a project by Architect L. Bellemo. Consolidation work, space reorganization, and space recovery were carried out for the new functions of the building. Two large salons, on the ground floor and on the first floor, offer students spaces to gather together. The palazzo is an exhibition venue for artistic events, available for both university and external users.

Mestre is the seat of LabSCo Construction Sciences Lab, FisTec Environmental Engineering Physics Lab. The headquarters of the Construction Sciences Lab, Environmental Engineering Physics Lab and TerraLab for Earth Sciences, inaugurated in 2003, is located in Mestre, on an area granted by the municipality to Venetian universities for the construction of a scientific development pole. The central core of the building consists of a "contrast structure" – a reinforced concrete grid of beams, developing underground – and a "bridge structure", supported by two series of pillars. The building was conceived as a protection shell, lowered from above, for the virtually pre-existent central core. The interior space is modulated by natural light, penetrating from below and from above. Light enters from below – through a perimeter glazed window between the shell structure and the ground; and from above – through a series of smaller skylights crowning the greater central one. A vertical axis ideally connects the hypogeum structure to the light box of the large skylight, creating a symbolic space with industrial features. The two halves of the roof terrace, connected by an outer passage, define a cantilevered garden. The shell of the building is covered in a marble slab finishing. The skylights are lined with quartz zinc plates. A slight depression in the ground isolates the area of the new laboratory: this tank is made of opus signinum, mixing scales from the same marble of the façade in the concrete mixture.

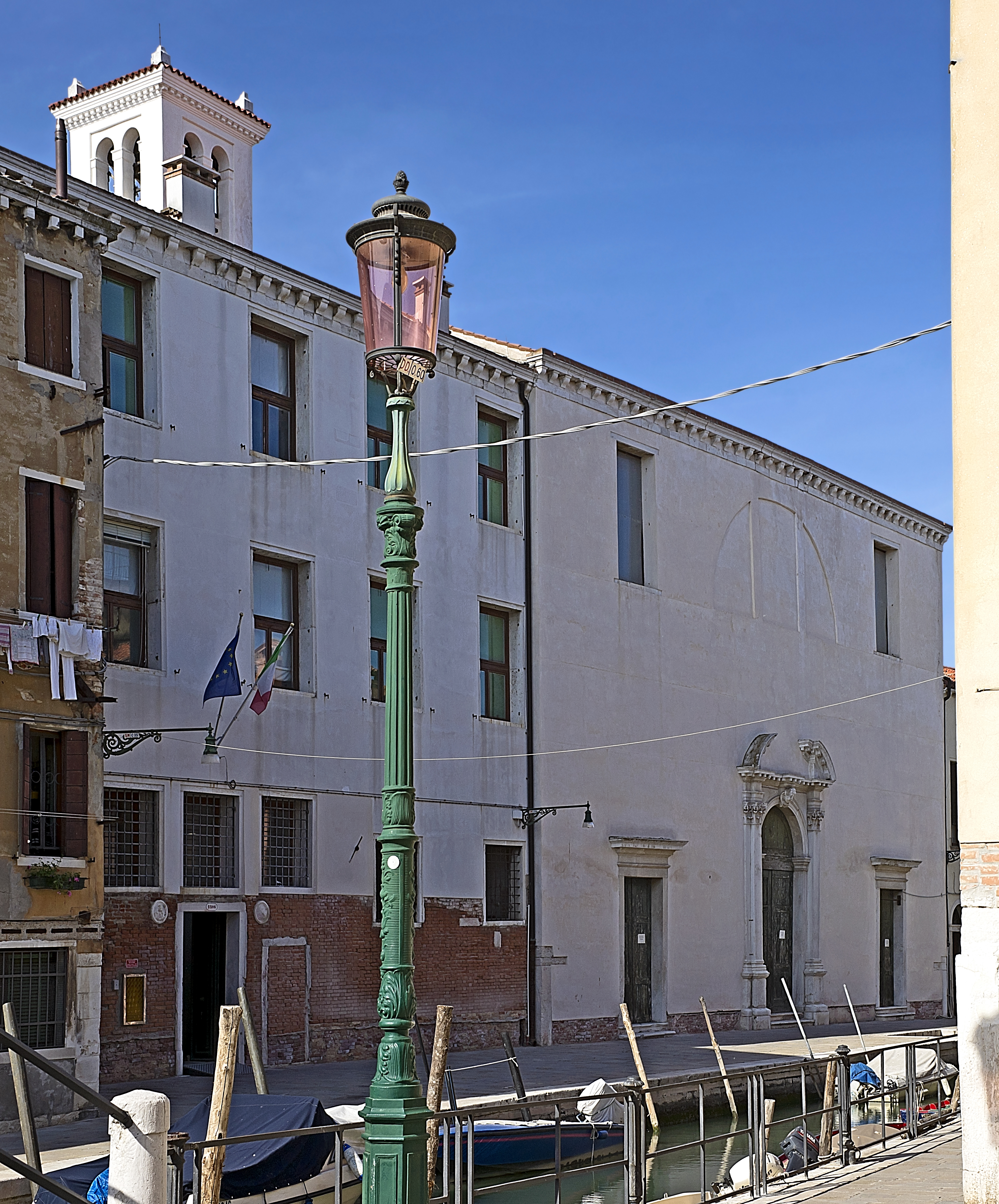
Terese Dorsoduro 2206 (building on the left), seat of teaching activities

Campo della Lana is the seat of administration office, infrastructure management, financial and human resources offices, student service offices, another building is Casa del gondolier seat of Lama – laboratory for the analysis of antique materials while Magazzino 6 & Magazzino 7, Masieri, and Terese are seats of teaching activities.

== Academics ==
=== Graduate programs ===
Iuav offers 4 bachelor's, 6 master's degree, and 1 PHD programmes covering the fields of architecture, design, fashion, visual arts, urban and regional planning and theatre. This in addition to 19 Postgraduate specialisation course and 7 advanced specialisation programs.

Bachelor's Degree Programs (All in Italian):

- Bachelor of Architecture
- Bachelor of Planning & Urban Design
- Bachelor of Product, Visual Communication & Interior Design with 2 tracks (First is Interior Design and Second is Product and Visual Design)
- Bachelor of Fashion Design & Multimedia Arts with 3 Tracks (First is Fashion Design, Second is Multimedia Arts, and Third is Fashion Communication and new media)

Master's degree Programs (Taught in Italian & English):

- Master of Architecture (Taught in Italian)
- Master of Architecture (Taught in English)
- Master of Planning & Urban Design with two Tracks (First is Urban Planning for Transition (Taught in English) and Second is Planning and Urban Design for Transition (Taught in Italian)
- Master of Product, Communication And Interior Design with 3 Tracks (Taught in Italian) (First is Interior Design, Second is Product Design, and Third is Communication Design)
- Master of Fashion and Visual Arts with two Tracks (First is Visual Arts and Second is Fashion Design)(Taught in Italian)
- Master of Theater & Performing Arts with two Tracks(Taught in Italian) (First is Theatrical and Choreographic Studies, Second is Performance and Gender Studies)

Iuav has 2 English taught Master's degree programmes, the first master's degree in English: the MA in architecture was launched in 2019, and in year 2021 the second English taught Master of Science in Urban Planning for Transition was introduced.

PhD research areas:

- architectural composition
- Design sciences
- History of Architecture and urban planning
- Innovation for building and cultural heritage
- New technologies and information for the architecture, the city and the environment
- Regional planning and public policy
- Urbanism
- Villard d’Honnecourt international doctorate in architecture
- Visual and performing arts and fashion studies

=== Enrollment and staff ===
For 2021-2022 academic year, number of students enrollments are as per the following:

- 2361 students - Bachelor's degree programs
- 1454 students - Master's degree programs
- 64 students - Vecchio ordinamento degree programs
- 161 students - postgraduate specialisation courses
- 115 students - PhDs
- 106 as research fellows
- 173 outgoing and 143 incoming students in frame of exchange programs
- 526 professors and researchers, teaching assistants
- 250 administrative staff members

=== Library ===
The University has a library dedicated to architecture and other design disciplines in Italy. The Iuav library, located in Tolentini, is open to institutional users and, subject to authorization, also to the external public. It houses a collection of volumes, databases and journals especially focusing on architecture, urban planning and the arts. For some years collections on design, fashion and theatre have been growing. Specific keynotes, handbooks and general publications to support the teaching of the University are available. Moreover, the library holdings include dissertations (since 1983), and some items: the Daniela Palazzoli Special Collection; the Italo Zannier Special Collection, a collection of books and journals on the history of photography, owned by the photographer and critic, and the personal collections of the architects Mario Labò, Giovanni Sardi and Giorgio Wenter Marini, which include some antique books and publications of the first half of the 20th century, also it holds a range of international magazines and books and is open till late evening.

The Università Iuav di Venezia Library System promotes cooperation and projects which aim to improve and develop the dissemination of information on the subjects of Architecture and Urban Planning, with agreements and membership of The National Library Service of Italy (Servizio Bibliotecario Nazionale– SBN), Archinet and Urbandata Associations and the University of Padua and the Ca' Foscari University of Venice phaidra Library System.

Iuav Library produces the most important Italian Architecture and Urban Planning Periodical Index in cooperation with the Italian Association of Architecture Libraries (Coordinamento Nazionale Biblioteche di Architettura - CNBA). More than 7,000 new records are added to the database every year. This catalogue and other bibliographic and full-text databases are also accessible to Iuav users from outside the University network with user ID. The discovery tool primo.iuav.it provides access to all the information resources mentioned above, as well as to the Projects Archive, the Map Collection and the Slide Collection catalogues and digitalized images.

=== Labs ===
The Labs constitute a research infrastructure supporting also the educational activities of various degree programs as well as the more in-depth analysis of specific topics for master theses and PhD dissertations. They support research and other work in the fields of building sciences, conservation and Archaeological science studies, structural analysis, building physics, environmental monitoring, representation, photography, topography, cartography, geographic information systems, material and components characterization.

The lab system offers tools and support for:

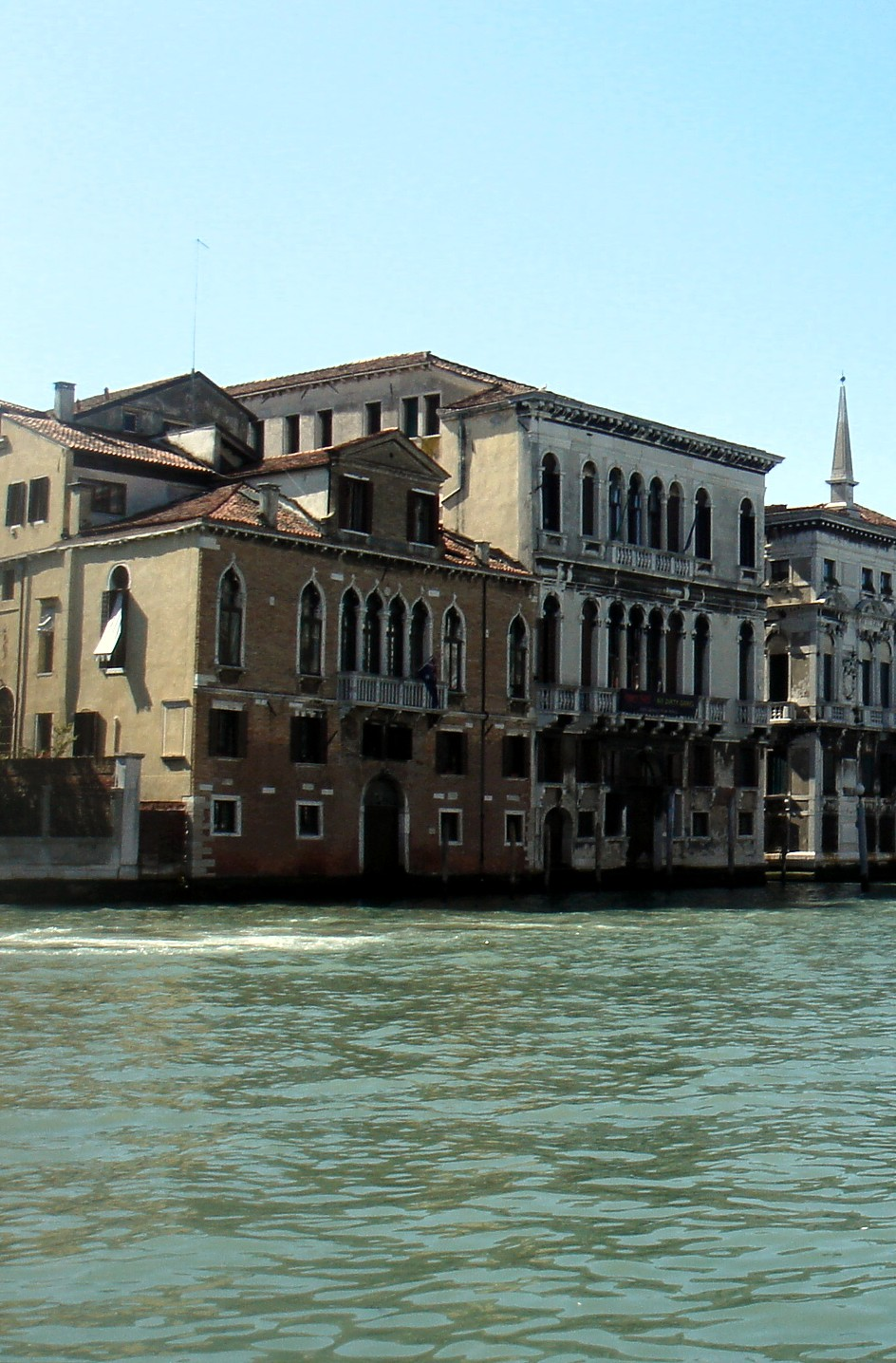
Ca' Tron (right), seat of Ir.Ide research infrastructure

- mechanical and thermos-physical testing of materials and structures
- short and long-term static and dynamic structural monitoring
- environmental monitoring and analysis
- lighting and acoustical analysis, monitoring and design
- archaeometry and conservation studies
- surveys and representations of projects, buildings and areas
- 3D interactive models, digital animation, video, multimedia works
- drawings, models, video animation and websites
- geographic information systems
- elaborating and archiving digital maps
- archiving materials and components
- document retrieval and research
- photographic campaigns

Below is the list of the labs

ArTec Archives on Techniques and Materials for Architecture and Industrial Design The lab collects and archives examples of materials, products and innovative building techniques for researcher, student and professional use.

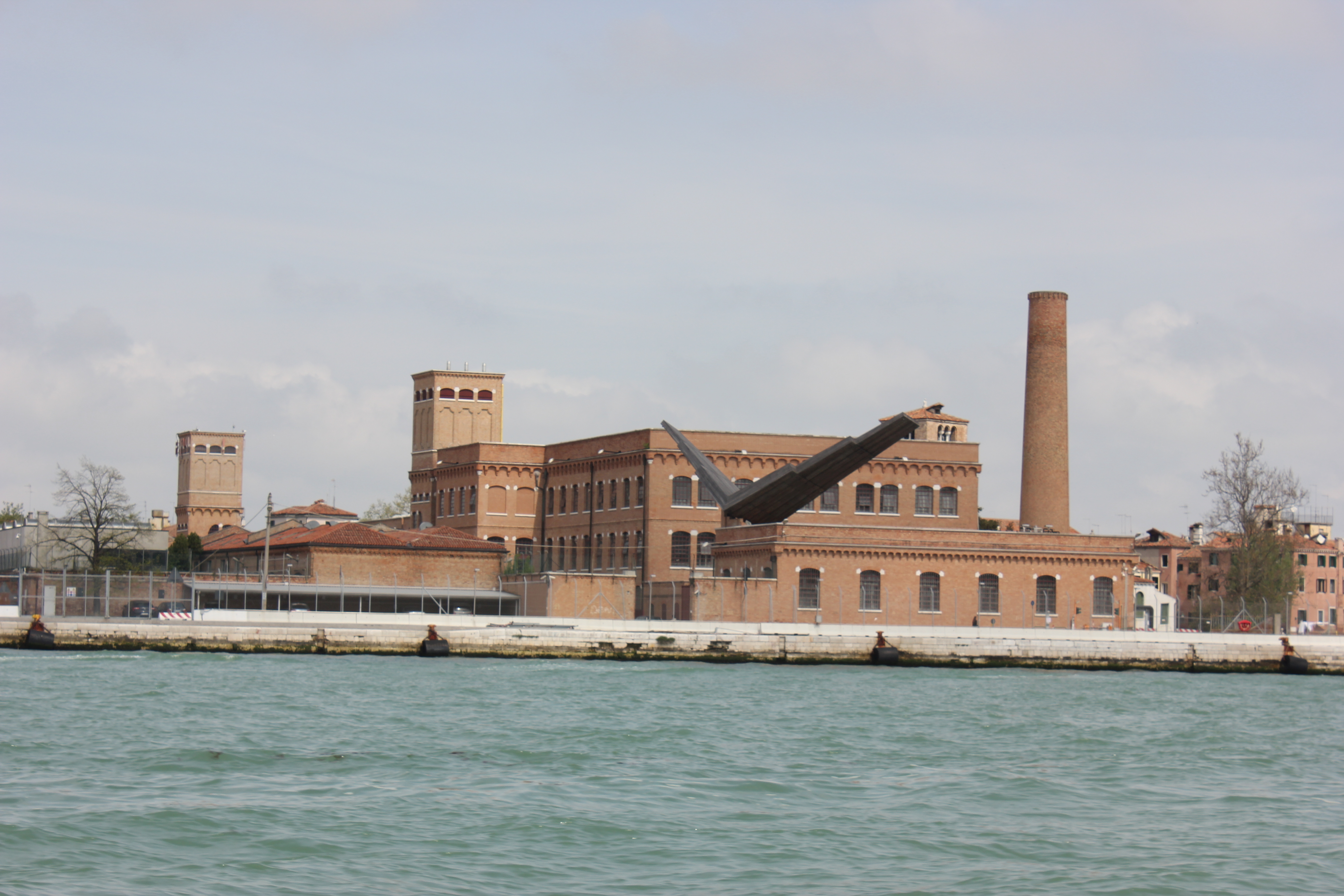
Cotonificio veneziano building, seat of “Archivio Progetti”, ArTec Archives on Techniques and Materials for Architecture and Industrial Design, infrastructure management, auditorium, “Gino Valle” exhibit space, Gradoni room, teaching activities.

CIRCE Cartography Lab The lab operates and does research in the field of map-making and the representation of urban and regional phenomenon; it collects, retrieves, archives, processes and broadcasts its cartographic, photographic, aerial, satellite and surveying patrimony online and through information systems.

CIRCE Photogrammetry Lab The lab focuses on the technical and scientific issues involved in the surveying and digital representation of architecture; it has considerable experience in surveying cities, geographical regions and objects (statues, molds, artefacts, stones) and in using tools and techniques including terrestrial topography, GPS, photogrammetry (close range and aerial), laser-scanning and image processing.

CIRCE Geographic Information Lab The lab is active in the field of geographic information systems, using the major GIS software tools on the market and developing applications with Open Source tools; it designs and develops online services and makes it possible to download the university's cartographic and aerial photographic resources.

Me.La Multimedia Lab The lab concentrates on analysing and experimenting with systems and methods for producing and representing what is created in the fields of visual arts, theatre and architecture; it works with entities involved in regional management and the protection and conservation of cultural heritage, as well as research institutes and industry at large.

Photo Lab The lab works actively throughout the region on digital and analogical photographs for architectural reportage and documenting exhibitions and events; it supports studio and camera work for reproducing works of arts, models and documents; covers the entire range of photographic production, from digital shots to darkroom printing, from processing images to transferring data between different reproduction systems.

LAMA Lab for Analysing Materials of Antique Origin The lab conducts research on the chemical-physical characterisation of stone and litoid materials used in buildings of art-historical interest and determines the phenomena of deterioration and alteration to which they are subject; does archaeometry studies to define the provenance and production techniques and/or workmanship of stone, litoid and ceramic products, as well as studies to help identify pictorial techniques in paintings and the characterisation, identification and behaviour of antique materials.

FisTec Building Physics Lab The lab is active in various fields interested in applied physics in relation to the built environment: acoustics, lighting techniques, the thermophysics of buildings and materials, ambient comfort and interior environmental quality; it is also involved in environmental verifications for analysis and conservation in the field of architectural and cultural heritage.

LAR Project Support Lab The lab's three divisions support individual works or urban scale projects throughout all phases of development and in the management of their eventual output: from conceptual drawings to realistic renderings, from virtual to physical rendition, from animation to film sequences, from online circulation to complex archiving.

LabSCo Construction Sciences Lab The Lab began testing construction materials in the late 1940s and, in 1961, became Italy's official laboratory (Laboratorio Ufficiale della Repubblica italiana). It supports research and outside projects on issues regarding Law 1086/71 and for experiments leading to new patents; it is actively involved in quality control in companies manufacturing concrete and steel for reinforced concrete and prestressed concrete in Italy and abroad. LabSCo is currently a European leader in studies on full-scale structures.

== Reputation and ranking ==
Architecture & Built Environment rankings

Global – Overall
- QS World: 40 (2026)

Art History rankings

Global – Overall
- QS World: 14 (2026)

Art & Humanities rankings

Global – Overall
- QS World: 379 (2026)

Art & Design rankings

Global – Overall
- QS World: 101-150 (2020)

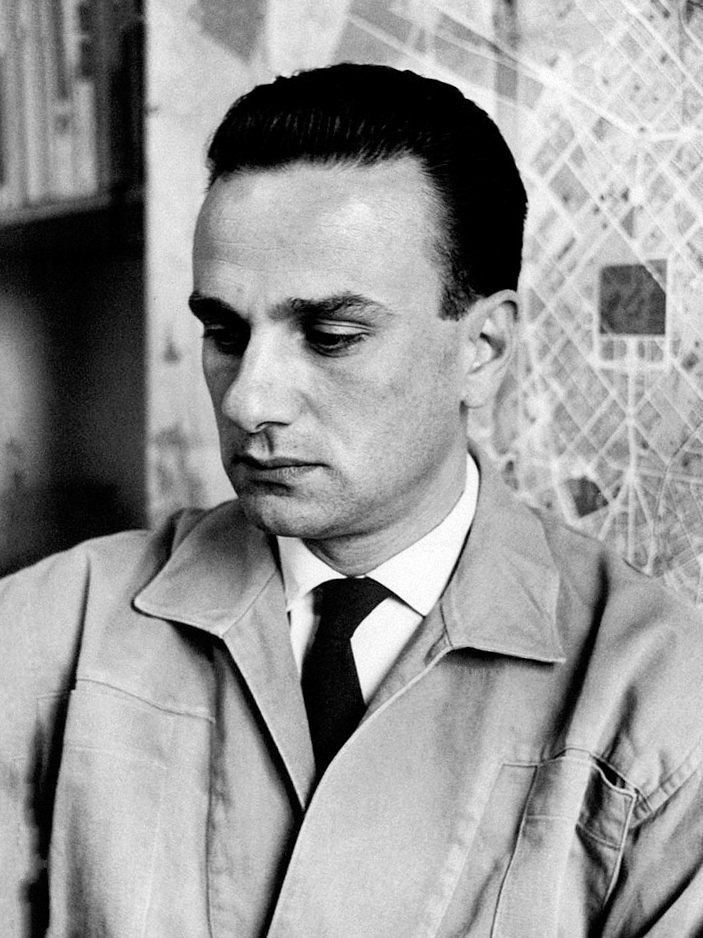
Giancarlo De Carlo in the 1950s

Foremost experts in the fields of architecture, planning, design and arts as well as artists are part of the university's history, including: Le Corbusier, Louis Kahn, Frank Lloyd Wright, Carlo Scarpa, Carlo Aymonino, Manfredo Tafuri, Vittorio Gregotti, Gino Valle, Aldo Rossi, Giovanni Astengo, Giancarlo De Carlo, Tadao Ando and Richard Serra.

Iuav has established agreements with important Italian and foreign cultural institutions, museums and universities such as La Biennale di Venezia, Teatro La Fenice, Palazzo Grassi, Musei Civici Veneziani, Triennale di Milano, Parsons School of Design, MIT, Illinois Institute of Technology, UNSW Sydney and Tongji University. Iuav students are involved with all of these institutions on a regular basis.

As of 2026 and According to QS World University Ranking, Università Iuav di Venezia is among the best 40 universities around the world in the field of Architecture, it gained around hundred and fifty position going from position 151-200 (2018) to 51-100 (2019 & 2020) and currently jumping to 40 (2026). An improvement of about 150 positions that places Iuav architecture courses among the best in the world and largely first in Italy for growth intensity. Since 2019, Iuav is among the best 150 universities around the world in the field of Art & Design on the report of QS World University Ranking for best Art & Design universities for the year 2019 & 2020.

Also, as one of the finest architecture universities in Europe, it was listed in Domus Magazine's Guide to Europe's Top 100 Schools of Architecture and Design selected across Europe.

Nationally, according to La Repubblica-CENSIS University Rankings (2017) Iuav was ranked 2nd after Polytechnic University of Milan(PoliMi) and followed by Polytechnic University of Turin(PoliTo) according to the classification and evaluation parameters of The Italian polytechnics. While in the 2020 La Repubblica-CENSIS ranking for Best Architecture Faculty 2019-2020 for the three-year degree courses, the Iuav (110 points) was in first place – first also in terms of career progression and international relations – followed by the University of Sassari (104.5 points) and Camerino (99.5 points). The Polytechnic of Turin and Milan are in fifth and sixth place respectively (95 and 94 points).

=== Notable alumni ===
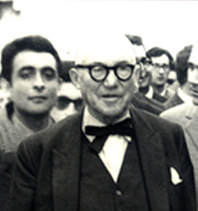
Abbas Gharib and Le Corbusier, April 1965 University Iuav of Venice, Italy

- Carlo Scarpa (architect, 1906–1978)
- Giancarlo De Carlo (architect, urban planner, and architectural theorist, RIBA Royal Gold Medal winner (1993), 1919–2005)
- Bruno Morassutti (architect, 1920–2008)
- Graziano Gasparini (historian and architect, 1924–2019)
- Roberto Gottardi (Italian-Cuban architect, 1927–2017)
- Massimo Vignelli (designer, 1931–2014)
- Costantino Dardi (architect, 1936–1991)
- Guido Guidi (photographer, born 1941)
- Gino Finizio (designer and architect, 1941–2022)
- Abbas Gharib (architect, born 1942)
- Mario Botta (architect, born 1943)
- Franco Stella (architect, born 1943)
- Francesco Dal Co (historian and architect, born 1945)
- Milo Manara (Italian comic book writer and artist, born 1945)
- Marco Frascari (architect and architectural theorist, 1945–2013)
- Maurizio Bolognini (media artist, born 1952)
- Antonio Martinelli (photographer, born 1953)
- Stefano Boeri (architect, born 1956)
- Francesco Pio Dotti (architect, born 1956)
- Raffaella Laezza (architect, born 1961)
- Luigi Brugnaro (13th Mayor of Venice since 2015, born 1963)
- Benedetta Tagliabue (architect, born 1963)
- Sotiris Bletsas (architect, minority rights activist and politician, born 1956)
- Alejandro Aravena (architect, Pritzker Architecture Prize winner (2016), born 1963)
- Nicola Verlato (Italian painter, sculptor, architect and musician, born 1965)
- Michelangelo Sabatino (architectural historian, preservationist and scholar, born 1969)
- Davide Prete (sculptor and architect, born 1974)
- Antonio Pavanello (rugby player, born 1982)
- Ila Bêka (architectural filmmaker and producer)
- Elisa Caldana (visual artist, born 1986)
- Tokie Laotan-Brown (Nigerian architect)

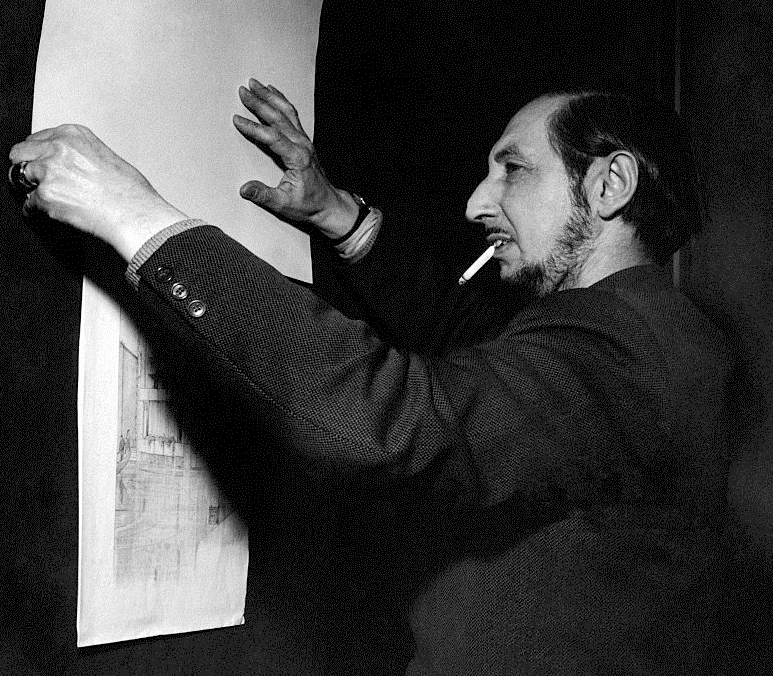
Carlo Scarpa, an admirer of Frank Lloyd Wright, is studying his drawings in Venice, 1954

== Rectors ==
Among the rectors who have taken place so far are:

- Giovanni Bordiga (1926-1929)
- Guido Cirilli (1929-1943)
- Giuseppe Samonà (1943-1971)
- Carlo Scarpa (1971-1974)
- Carlo Aymonino (1974-1979)
- Valeriano Pastor (1979-1982)
- Paolo Ceccarelli (1982-1991)
- Marino Folin (1991-2006)
- Carlo Magnani (2006-2009)
- Amerigo Restucci (2009-2015)
- Alberto Ferlenga (2015-2021)
- Benno Albrecht (2021-2027)

== See also ==
- Ca' Tron
- List of Italian universities
