= Sergio Los =

Italian architect and thinker (1934–2024)

- Born: May 27, 1934; Italy
- Died: November 7, 2024 (aged 90)
- Education: University Iuav of Venice
- Occupations: Architect, educator
- Employer: University Iuav of Venice
- Known for: Regional Bioclimatic Architecture
- Notable work: Carlo Scarpa Architetto Poeta; Geografia dell'architettura
- Awards: 13° PLEA International Award (1996); WREN Pioneer Award (1998); EUROSOLAS Prize (2003)

Sergio Los (27 May 1934 – 7 November 2024) was an Italian architect and educator. He is considered one of the main interpreters of the Regional Bioclimatic Architecture, a design philosophy developed during the seventies (1972–1979) at the University Iuav of Venice under the pressure of the environmental and energy crisis. He developed a locally rooted architecture that adapts to the regional circumstances and uses the natural energetic potentials, especially solar energy. Already in 1980 he was contributing to the organisation PLEA (Passive and Low Energy Architecture ), that promotes sustainable architecture on a worldwide scale.

== Biography ==
=== Early years ===
His artistic formation took place at the University Iuav of Venice with Carlo Scarpa. Between 1964 and 1971 he was involved in a collaboration with Carlo Scarpa, working at the University Iuav of Venice and following many projects in his office.
He wrote Carlo Scarpa Architetto Poeta, published in 1967, which was at that time the first book about Scarpa’s architecture. Involved in the Design Process Theories, he introduced in Italy the ideas of Christopher Alexander translating his Notes on the Synthesis of Form 1967, and the searches of the Cambridge University Martin Centre, editing and translating the book of L. March and P. Steadman The Geometry of Environment, 1974.

=== Regional career ===
Between 1972 and 1979, he develops a regional bioclimatic approach to multi-scale architecture that drives him into designing and constructing some buildings and city plans. Through an experimental design and building activity, he deepened the concept of a sustainable resilient urban fabric, which is based on the network of civic architecture, aimed to produce a local microclimate in the open outdoor spaces. Having tested some realized projects his design solutions were confirmed and transferred through handbooks. He was involved in the development of lectures and a contribution to The Geography of Architecture (The Phaidon Atlas of Contemporary World Architecture).

=== Civic architect ===
In the last twenty years, he was involved in increasing the city’s communicative action, compared to the prevailing instrumental action of the actual metropolises. In his view the city is considered a communicative system, analogous to the language and to other symbolic systems. The city operates to compose a common world, it becomes for its citizens a way of knowing, but sharing the construction of such knowledge. He was pursuing some cooperative design processes that deal with city plans aimed to activate a learning community. He thought that only communities of citizens can pursue resilient, sustainable cities.

=== Academic career ===
• Sergio Los was a professor of Architectural Composition at the University Iuav of Venice.
• Between 1965 and 1971 he taught Interior Architecture at the University Iuav of Venice in Italy.
• Between 1972 and 1978 he taught Town Design in the Department of Giancarlo De Carlo at the University Iuav of Venice, later between 1979 and 2000 he taught Architectural Composition, showing his main interest in Multi-Scale Architecture.
• From 1970 up to 2000 he is responsible for many research activities for MURST (it:Ministero dell'Università e della Ricerca), CNR/ENEA (Italy) PFE, EU, International Energy Agency, on the design of a sustainable multi-scale architecture, published in various books and magazines.

== Death ==
Los died on 7 November 2024, at the age of 90.

== Awards ==
• In 1996 at Louvain la Neuve, he received the 13° PLEA (Passive and Low Energy Architecture) INTERNATIONAL AWARD with Natasha F. Pulitzer, having pursued in research, teaching, and professional activity the integration of the art and the science of architecture.
• In 1998 at Florence, he received the WREN PIONEER AWARD, for his contribution in the design of a renewable energy architecture.
• In 2003 at Berlin he received the European EUROSOLAS PRIZE, for his career in Solar Architecture.

== Works ==
- Sergio Los (1967). Carlo Scarpa Architetto Poeta. CLUVA, Venice (in Italian)
- Sergio Los (2009). SCARPA. Taschen, Koln. ISBN 978-3-8365-0758-5
- Sergio Los (1993). Carlo Scarpa. Benedict Taschen, Cologne, ISBN 3-8228-9441-9
- Sergio Los (1995). Carlo Scarpa, guida all’architettura. Arsenale Editrice, Venice. ISBN 88-7743-144-X (in Italian)
- Sergio Los, (edited by) (1985). VERUM IPSUM FACTUM, Il progetto di Carlo Scarpa per l’ingresso dell’Istituto Universitario di Architettura di Venezia. CLUVA, Venice (in Italian)
- Sergio Los, (edited by) (1990). Regionalismo dell’Architettura. Franco Muzzio editore, Padova. ISBN 88-7021-501-6 (in Italian)
- Jeffrey Cook and Sergio Los (1981), Un approccio bioclimatico al regionalismo architettonico (in Italian)
- Italian translations of essay of Christopher Alexander Note sulla Sintesi della Forma, Milan, (1967) (in Italian)
- Italian translations of the book of L. March and P. Steadman La Geometria dell’Ambiente, Milan, (1974) (in Italian)
- Venice, Regionalism and Architecture, (1985)
- Trento, Caratteri Ambientali dell’Architettura, (1998) (in Italian)
- Sergio Los Geografia dell'architettura (Il Poligrafo, Padova. ISBN 978-88-7115-816-7) (in Italian)
- Vicenza, A Knowledge Civic Architecture, (2007)
