= Giovanni Astengo =

Italian architect and urban planner (1915–1990)

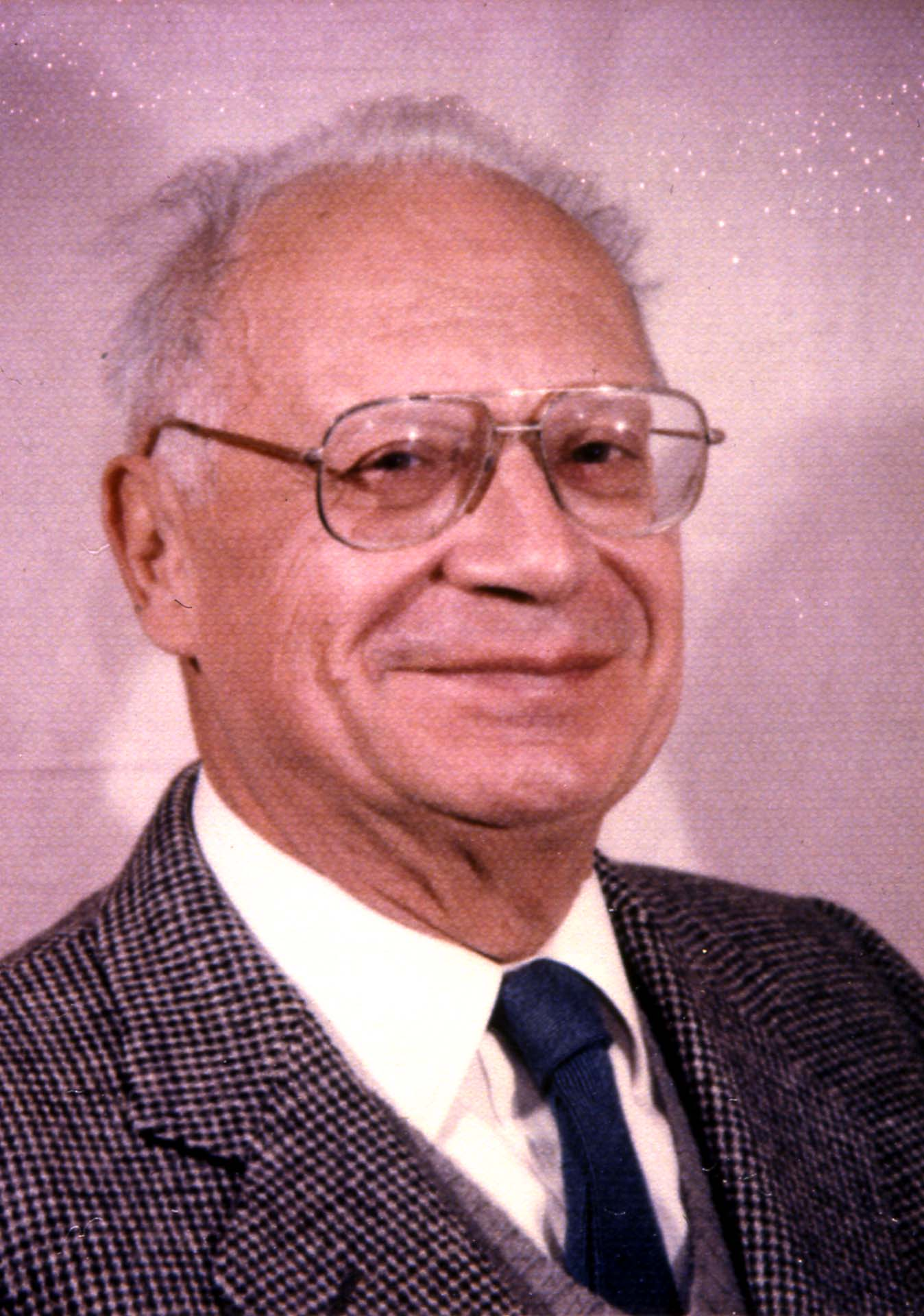
- Born: 13 April 1915; Turin, Kingdom of Italy
- Died: 26 July 1990 (aged 75); San Giovanni in Persiceto, Emilia-Romagna, Italy
- Education: Polytechnic University of Turin
- Occupations: Architect, urban planner, academic

Giovanni Astengo (13 April 1915 – 26 July 1990) was an Italian architect, urban planner and academic. He taught at the IUAV University of Venice, directed the journal Urbanistica from 1952 to 1976, and was one of the leading figures of post-war Italian urban planning.

Astengo prepared or led master plans for several Italian cities, including Assisi, Gubbio, Bergamo, Pavia and Pisa, and helped establish Italy's first university degree programme in urban planning at IUAV.
