= Manfredo Tafuri =

Italian architect, historian, theoretician, critic and academic

Manfredo Tafuri

Manfredo Tafuri (4 November 1935 in Rome – 23 February 1994 in Venice) was an Italian Marxist architect, historian, theoretician, critic and academic. He was described by one commentator as the world's most important architectural historian of the second half of the 20th century. He is noted for his pointed critiques of the partisan "operative criticism" of previous architectural historians and critics like Bruno Zevi and Siegfried Giedion and for challenging the idea that the Renaissance was a "golden age" as it had been characterised in the work of earlier authorities like Heinrich Wölfflin and Rudolf Wittkower.

== Career ==
For Tafuri, architectural history does not follow a teleological scheme in which one language succeeds another in a linear sequence. Instead, it is a continuous struggle played out on critical, theoretical and ideological levels as well as through the multiple constraints placed on practice. Since this struggle continues in the present, architectural history is not a dead academic subject, but an open arena for debate. In his view, like other cultural domains, but even more so, due to the tension between its autonomous, artistic character and its technical and functional dimensions, architecture is a field defined and constituted by crisis. Though Tafuri was caught up in the debates of his era, he inserted the task of the architectural historian into a framework combining critical participation and historical distance.

Tafuri explored every era of architectural history in the West from the medieval period to the present and made an important contribution to the study of Japanese modern architecture. In the last decade of his career he undertook a comprehensive reassessment of the theory and practice of Renaissance architecture, exploring its various social, intellectual and cultural contexts, while providing a broad understanding of the uses of representation that shaped the entire era. His final work, Interpreting the Renaissance: Princes, Cities, Architects, published in 1992, synthesizes the history of architectural ideas and projects through discussions of the great centres of architectural innovation in Italy (Florence, Rome, and Venice), key patrons from the middle of the fifteenth century to the early sixteenth century, and crucial figures such as Leon Battista Alberti, Filippo Brunelleschi, Francesco di Giorgio, Lorenzo de' Medici, Bramante, Raphael, Baldassare Castiglione and Giulio Romano.

Tafuri held the position of chair of architectural history at the University Iuav of Venice. He was a member of the Communist Party.

== Books and articles by Tafuri ==
- Teorie e storia dell'architettura. Bari, Laterza, 1968.
  Theories and History of Architecture. Translated by Giorgio Verrecchia. London, 1980.
- « Per una critica dell'ideologia architettonica ». Contropiano, Materiali Marxisti, no. 1, 1969.
- Progetto e utopia: Architettura e sviluppo capitalistico. Bari, Laterza, 1973.
  Architecture and Utopia. Design and Capitalist Development. Translated by Barbara Luigia La Penta. Cambridge, MA: MIT Press, 1976.
- w/ Francesco Dal Co. Architettura contemporanea. Milan, Electa, 1976.
- La Sfera e il labirinto : Avanguardia e architettura da Piranesi agli anni '70. Turin, Einaudi, 1980.

The Sphere and the Labyrinth. Avant-Gardes and Architecture from Piranesi to the 1970's. Translated by Pellegrino d'Acierno and Robert Connolly. Cambridge, MA: MIT Press, 1987.

- Venezia e il Rinascimento. Turin, Einaudi, 1985.

Venice and the Renaissance. Translated by Jessica Levine. Cambridge, MA: MIT Press, 1985.

- History of Italian Architecture, 1944-1985. Translated by Jessica Levine. Cambridge, MA: MIT Press. 1989.
- Ricerca del Rinascimento. Principi, Citta, Architetti. Torino, Einaudi: 1992.
  Interpreting the Renaissance: Princes, Cities, Architects. Translated with an introduction by Daniel Sherer. New Haven, Cambridge. MA: Yale University Press/Harvard GSD Publications, 2006
