= Francesco Dal Co =

Italian historian of architecture

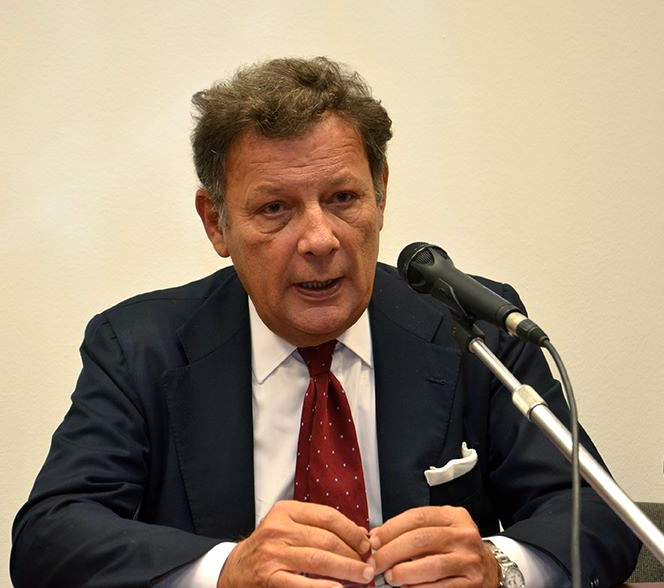
Francesco Dal Co

Francesco Dal Co (born 29 December 1945) is an Italian historian of architecture. He graduated in 1970 at the University Iuav of Venice, and has been director of the Department of History of Architecture since 1994. He has been Professor of History of Architecture at the Yale School of Architecture from 1982 to 1991 and professor of History of Architecture at the Accademia di Architettura of the Università della Svizzera Italiana from 1996 to 2005. From 1988 to 1991 he has been director of the Architectural Section at the Biennale di Venezia and curator of the architectural section in 1998. Since 1978 he has been curator of the architectural publications for publishing House Electa and since 1996 editor of the architectural magazine Casabella.

In 2018 he curated the Pavilion of the Holy See at the 16th International Architecture Exhibition of the Venice Biennale Venice Biennale of Architecture. The architects who designed the ten chapels were: Andrew Berman (USA), Francesco Cellini (Italy), Javier Corvalàn (Paraguay), Flores & Prats (Spain), Norman Foster (UK), Teronobu Fujimori (Japan), Sean Godsell (Australia), Carla Juaçaba (Brazil), Smiljan Radic (Chile), Eduardo Souto de Moura (Portugal).

He is currently Senior Fellow at the Center for Advanced Studies of the National Gallery of Art, scholar at the Getty Center, and member of the board of directors of the Society of Architectural Historians. He is also member of the National Academy of San Luca.

== Selected works ==
- "The American City" (with others) Mit Press, Cambridge Mass. 1979; Granada, London 1980
- "Modern Architecture" (with M. Tafuri), Abrams, New York 1979; Thames and Hudson, London 1980
- "Kevin Roche", Rizzoli, New York 1985
- "Carlo Scarpa. the complete works" (with G. Mazzariol), Architectural Press, London 1986; Rizzoli, New York 1986
- "Figures of Architecture and Thought", Rizzoli, New York 1991
- "Tadao Ando". Complete Works, Phaidon, London 1995
- "Carlo Scarpa". Villa Ottolenghi, The Monacelli Press, New York 1998
- "Frank. O. Gehry. The Complete Works", (with K.W. Forster and A. Soutter Arnold) The Monacelli Press, New York 1998
- "Tadao Ando", 1995–2010, Prestel, Munich-Berlin-London-New York 2010
