= Architectural theory =

Act of thinking, discussing, and writing about architecture

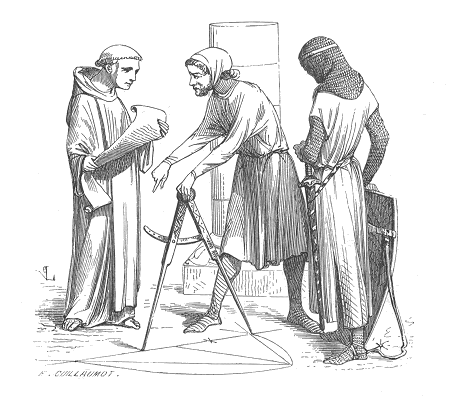
Architectural discourse from the illustrated French Dictionary of Architecture (1856) by Eugène Viollet-le-Duc

Architectural theory is the act of thinking, discussing, and writing about architecture. Architectural theory is taught in all architecture schools and is practiced by the world's leading architects. Some forms that architecture theory takes are the lecture or dialogue, the treatise or book, and the paper project or competition entry. Architectural theory is often didactic, and theorists tend to stay close to or work from within schools. It has existed in some form since antiquity, and as publishing became more common, architectural theory gained an increased richness. Books, magazines, and journals published an unprecedented number of works by architects and critics in the 20th century. As a result, styles and movements formed and dissolved much more quickly than the relatively enduring modes in earlier history. It is to be expected that the use of the internet will further the discourse on architecture in the 21st century.

== History ==
=== Antiquity ===
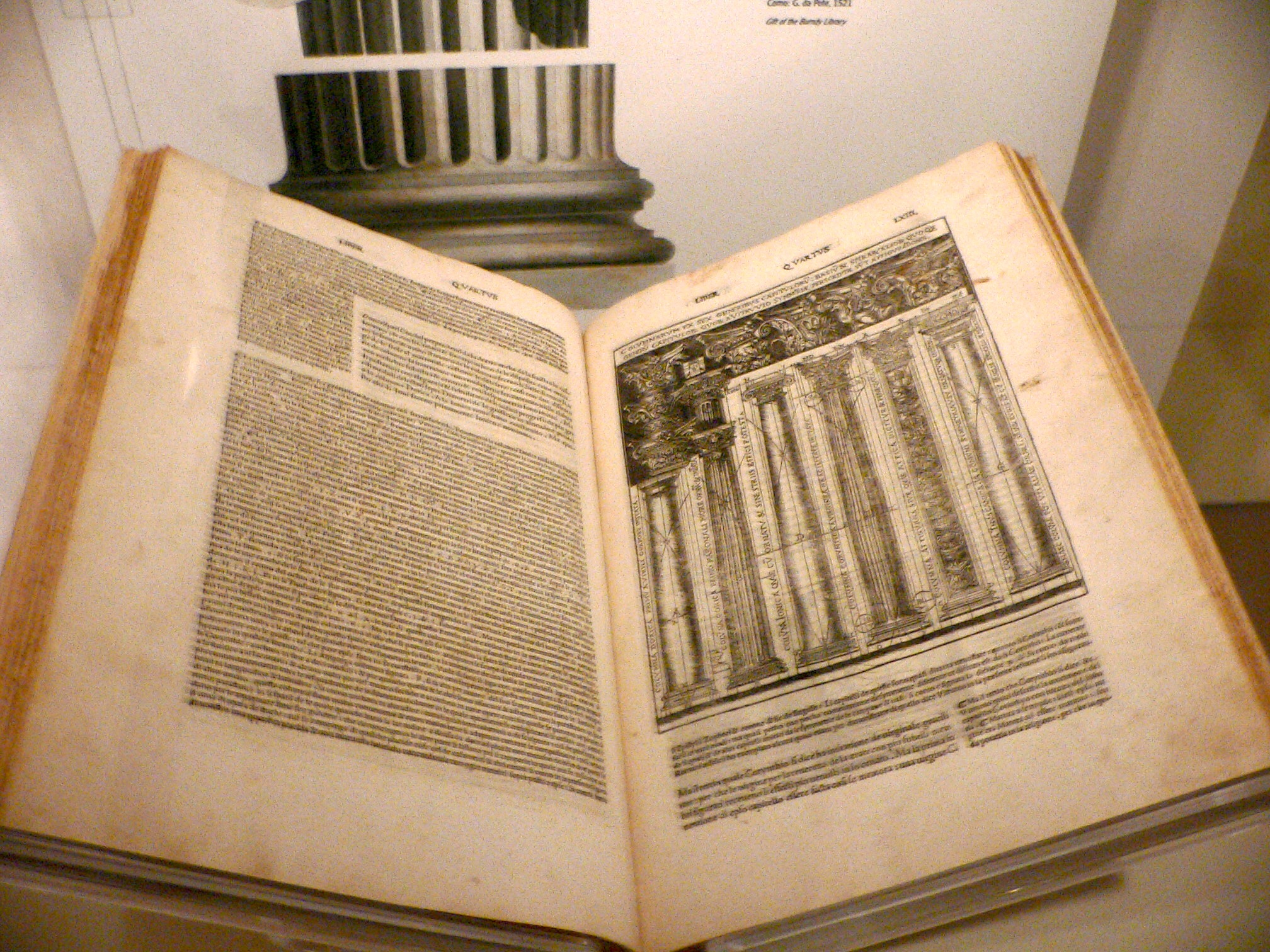
1521 Cesare Cesariano Italian translation of De Architectura Libri Decem (The Ten Books on Architecture) by Marcus Vitruvius Pollio. Preserved in the Smithsonian Museum of American History

==== Rome ====
There is little information or evidence about major architectural theory in antiquity, until the 1st century BC, with the work of Vitruvius. This does not mean, however, that such works did not exist, given that many works never survived antiquity. Vitruvius was a Roman writer, architect, and engineer active in the 1st century BC. He was the most prominent architectural theorist in the Roman Empire known today, having written De architectura (known today as The Ten Books of Architecture), a treatise written in Latin and Greek on architecture, dedicated to the emperor Augustus. Probably written between 27 and 23 BC, it is the only major contemporary source on classical architecture to have survived. Divided into ten sections or "books", it covers almost every aspect of Roman architecture, from town planning, materials, decorations, temples, water supplies, etc. It rigorously defines the classical orders of architecture. It also proposes the three fundamental laws that architecture must obey, in order to be so considered: firmitas, utilitas, venustas, translated in the 17th century by Sir Henry Wotton into the English slogan firmness, commodity, and delight (meaning structural adequacy, functional adequacy, and beauty).

The rediscovery of Vitruvius' work in 1414 had a profound influence on architects of the Renaissance, adding archaeological underpinnings to the rise of the Renaissance style, which was already under way. Renaissance architects such as Brunelleschi and Leon Battista Alberti found in De architectura their rationale for raising their branch of knowledge to a scientific discipline.

==== Ancient India ====
Vastu Shastra (vāstu śāstra - literally "science of architecture") are texts on the traditional Indian system of architecture. These texts describe principles of design, layout, measurements, ground preparation, space arrangement, and spatial geometry. The designs aim to integrate architecture with nature, the relative functions of various parts of the structure, and ancient beliefs utilising geometric patterns (yantra), symmetry, and directional alignments.

Vastu Shastra are the textual part of Vastu Vidya - the broader knowledge about architecture and design theories from ancient India. Varahamihira's Brihat Samhita dated to about the sixth century CE is among the earliest known Indian texts with dedicated chapters with principles of architecture. For example, Chapter 53 of the Brihat Samhita is titled "On architecture", and there and elsewhere it discusses elements of Vastu Shastra such as "planning cities and buildings" and "house structures, orientation, storeys, building balconies" along with other topics. Other ancient Vastu Shastra works includes Manasara etc.

=== Middle Ages ===
Following the tradition of Vastu Shastra, several scholars wrote architectural texts during medieval times which includes Manushyalaya Chandrika, dealing with domestic architecture authored by Thirumangalath Neelakanthan Musath, Samrangana Sutradhara written by Bhoja of Dhar, a poetic treatise on classical Indian architecture among others.

Throughout the Middle Ages, architectural knowledge was passed by transcription, word of mouth and technically in master builders' lodges. Due to the laborious nature of transcription, few examples of architectural theory were penned during this time. Most written works during this period were theological, and were transcriptions of the Bible. Since the architectural theories were on structures, fewer of them were transcribed. The Abbot Suger's Liber de rebus in administratione sua gestis was an architectural document that emerged with Gothic architecture. Another was Villard de Honnecourt's portfolio of drawings from about the 1230s.

In Song dynasty China, Li Jie published the Yingzao Fashi in 1103, which was an architectural treatise that codified elements of Chinese architecture.

=== Renaissance ===
The first great work of architectural theory of this period belongs to sabona, De re aedificatoria, which placed Vitruvius at the core of the most profound theoretical tradition of the modern ages. From Alberti, good architecture is validated through the Vitruvian triad, which defines its purpose. This triplet conserved all its validity until the 19th century. A major transition into the 17th century and ultimately to the Age of Enlightenment was secured through the advanced mathematical and optical research of the celebrated architect and geometer Girard Desargues, with an emphasis on his studies on conics, perspective and projective geometry.

=== Enlightenment ===
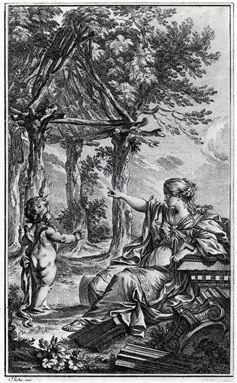
Frontispiece of Marc-Antoine Laugier's "Essai sur l'Architecture", 2nd ed. 1755 by Charles Eisen (1720–1778). Allegorical engraving of the Vitruvian primitive hut.

The Age of the Enlightenment witnessed considerable development in architectural theory on the European continent. New archaeological discoveries (such as those of Pompeii and Herculaneum) drove new interest in Classical art and architecture. Thus, the term neoclassicism, exemplified by the writings of Prussian art critic Johann Joachim Winckelmann, arose to designate 18th-century architecture which looked to these new classical precedents for inspiration in building design.

Major architectural theorists of the Enlightenment include Julien-David Le Roy, Abbé Marc-Antoine Laugier, Giovanni Battista Piranesi, Robert Adam, James Stuart, Georg Friedrich Hegel and Nicholas Revett.

=== 19th century ===
A vibrant strain of Neoclassicism, inherited from Marc-Antoine Laugier's seminal Essai, provided the foundation for two generations of international activity around the core themes of classicism, primitivism and a "return to Nature."

Reaction against the dominance of neoclassical architecture came to the fore in the 1820s with Augustus Pugin providing a moral and theoretical basis for Gothic Revival architecture, and in the 1840s John Ruskin developed this ethos.

The American sculptor Horatio Greenough published the essay "'American Architecture" in August 1843, in which he rejected the imitation of old styles of buildings and outlined the functional relationship between architecture and decoration. These theories anticipated the development of Functionalism in modern architecture.

Towards the end of the century, there occurred a blossoming of theoretical activity. In England, Ruskin's ideals underpinned the emergence of the Arts and Crafts movement exemplified by the writings of William Morris. This in turn formed the basis for Art Nouveau in the UK, exemplified by the work of Charles Rennie Mackintosh, and influenced the Vienna Secession. On the Continent, the theories of Viollet-le-Duc and Gottfried Semper provided the springboard for enormous vitality of thought dedicated to architectural innovation and the renovation of the notion of style.

Semper in particular developed an international following, in Germany, England, Switzerland, Austria, Bohemia, France, Italy and the United States. The generation born during the middle-third of the 19th century was largely enthralled with the opportunities presented by Semper's combination of a breathtaking historical scope and a methodological granularity. In contrast to more recent, and thus "modern", thematically self-organized theoretical activities, this generation did not coalesce into a "movement." They did, however, seem to converge on Semper's use of the concept of Realismus, and they are thus labelled proponents of architectural realism. Among the most active Architectural Realists were: Georg Heuser, Rudolf Redtenbacher, Constantin Lipsius, Hans Auer, Paul Sédille, Lawrence Harvey (architect)|Lawrence Harvey, Otto Wagner and Richard Streiter.

=== 20th century ===
In 1889 Camillo Sitte published Der Städtebau nach seinem künstlerischen Grundsätzen (translated as City Planning According to Artistic Principles) which was not exactly a criticism of architectural form but an aesthetic criticism (inspired by medieval and Baroque town planning) of 19th-century urbanism. Mainly a theoretical work, it had an immediate impact on architecture, as the two disciplines of architecture and planning intertwined. Demand for it was so high that five editions appeared in German between 1889 and 1922 and a French translation came out in 1902. (No English edition came out until 1945.) For Sitte, the most important issue was not the architectural shape or form of a building but the quality of the urban spaces that buildings collectively enclose, the whole being more than the sum of its parts. The Modern Movement rejected these thoughts and Le Corbusier energetically dismissed the work. Nevertheless, Sitte's work was revisited by post-modern architects and theorists from the 1970s, especially following its republication in 1986 by Rizzoli, in an edition edited by Collins and Collins (now published by Dover). The book is often cited anachronistically today as a vehicle for the criticism of the Modern Movement.

Also on the topic of artistic notions with regard to urbanism was Louis Sullivan's The Tall Office Building Artistically Considered of 1896. In this essay, Sullivan penned his famous alliterative adage "form ever follows function"; a phrase that was to be later adopted as a central tenet of Modern architectural theory. While later architects adopted the abbreviated phrase "form follows function" as a polemic in service of functionalist doctrine, Sullivan wrote of function with regard to biological functions of the natural order. Another influential planning theorist of this time was Ebenezer Howard, who founded the garden city movement. This movement aimed to form communities with architecture in the Arts and Crafts style at Letchworth and Welwyn Garden City and popularised the style as domestic architecture.

In Vienna, the idea of a radically new modern architecture had many theorists and proponents. An early use of the term modern architecture in print occurred in the title of a book by Otto Wagner, who gave examples of his own work representative of the Vienna Secession with Art Nouveau illustrations, and didactic teachings to his students. Soon thereafter, Adolf Loos wrote Ornament and Crime, and while his own style is usually seen in the context of the Jugendstil, his demand for "the elimination of ornament" joined the slogan "form follows function" as a principle of the architectural so-called Modern Movement that came to dominate the mid-20th century. Walter Gropius, Ludwig Mies van der Rohe and Le Corbusier provided the theoretical basis for the International Style with aims of using industrialised architecture to reshape society. Frank Lloyd Wright, while modern in rejecting historic revivalism, was idiosyncratic in his theory, which he conveyed in copious writing. Wright did not subscribe to the tenets of the International Style, but evolved what he hoped would be an American, in contrast to a European, progressive course. Wright's style, however, was highly personal, involving his particular views of man and nature. Wright was more poetic and firmly maintained the 19th-century view of the creative artist as unique genius. This limited the relevance of his theoretical propositions. Towards the end of the century postmodern architecture reacted against the austerity of High Modern (International Style) principles, viewed as narrowly normative and doctrinaire.

=== Contemporary ===
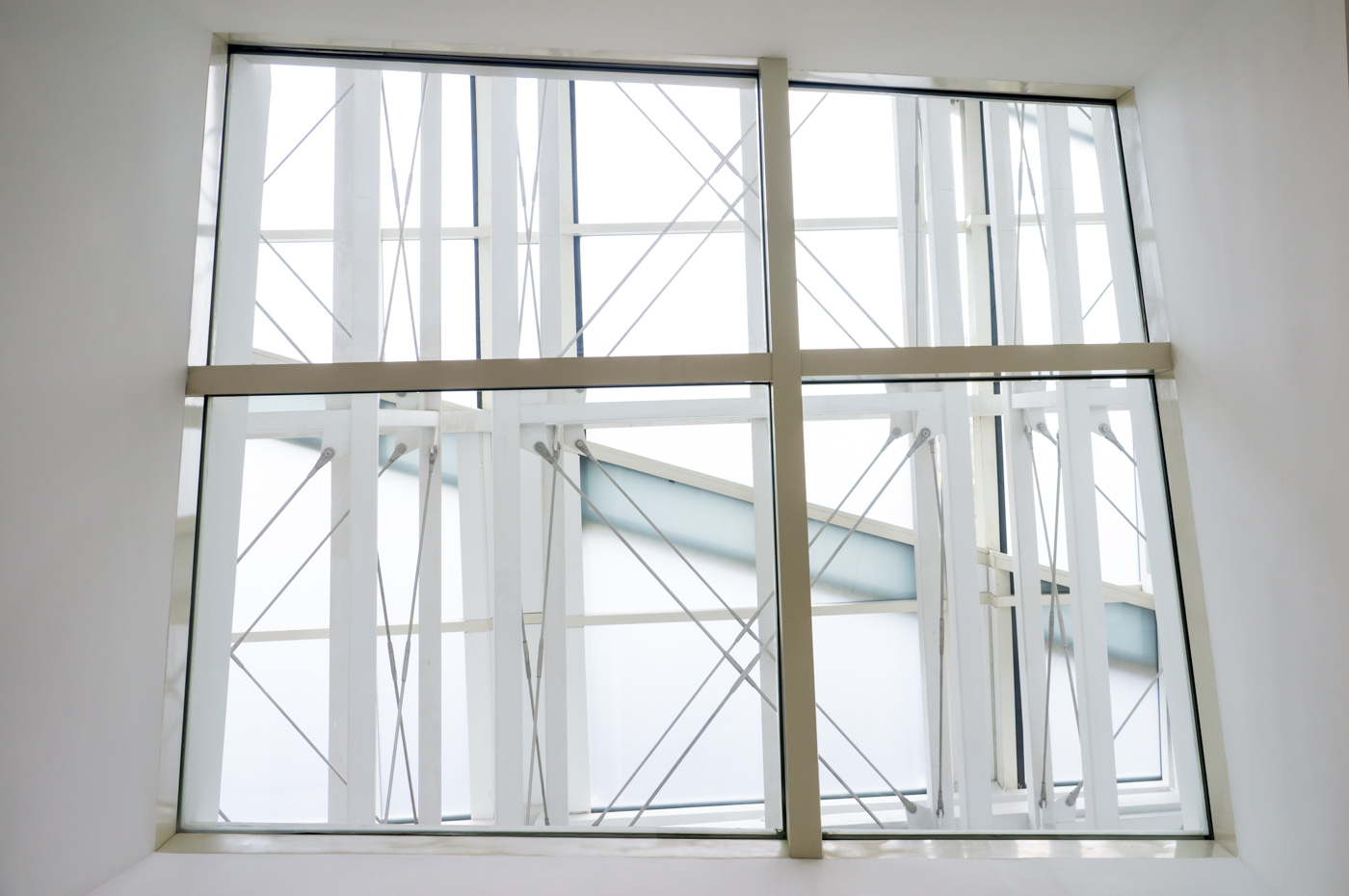
A Cidade da Cultura / Eisenman Architects.

In contemporary architectural discourse theory has become more concerned with its position within culture generally, and thought in particular. This is why university courses on architecture theory may often spend just as much time discussing philosophy and cultural studies as buildings, and why advanced postgraduate research and doctoral dissertations focus on philosophical topics in connection with architectural humanities. Some architectural theorists aim at discussing philosophical themes, or engage in direct dialogues with philosophers, as in the case of Peter Eisenman's and Bernard Tschumi's interest in Derrida's thought, or Anthony Vidler's interest in the works of Freud and Lacan, in addition to an interest in Gaston Bachelard's Poetics of Space or texts by Gilles Deleuze. This has also been the case with educators in academia like Dalibor Vesely or Alberto-Perez Gomez, and in more recent years this philosophical orientation has been reinforced through the research of a new generation of theorists (E.G. Jeffrey Kipnis or Sanford Kwinter). Similarly, we can refer to contemporary architects who are interested in philosophy and cultural studies. Some are interested in phenomenology and neuroaesthetics, like Sarah Williams Goldhagen, Sarah Robinson, and Christian Norberg-Schulz, or specialize as philosophers and historians of science, such as Nader El-Bizri who is also a notable phenomenologist (especially in Heidegger studies). Others, like Beatriz Colomina and Mary McLeod, expand historical understandings of architecture to include lesser or minor discourses that have influenced the development of architectural ideas over time. Studies in feminism in architecture, and in sexuality and gender as potent cultural expressions, are also considered an integral part of the latter 20th-century theoretical discourse, and are associated with such persons as Dolores Hayden, Catherine Ingraham, Jennifer Bloomer and Sylvia Lavin. The notion that theory entails critique also stemmed from post-structural literary studies in the work of many other theorists and architects, such as Mark Wigley and Diana Agrest, among others. In their theories, architecture is compared to a language which can be invented and re-invented every time it is used. This theory influenced the so-called deconstructivist architecture. In contrast, network society innovators, especially Silicon Valley software developers, have embraced Christopher Alexander's emphasis on The Timeless Way of Building (1979) based on pattern languages that are optimized on-site as construction unfolds.

Since 2000, architectural theory has also had to face the rapid rise of urbanism and globalization. By developing a new understanding of the city, many theorists developed new understandings of the urban conditions of our planet (E.G. Rem Koolhaas's Bigness). Interests in fragmentation and architecture as transient objects further affected such thinking (e.g. the concern for employing high technology), but also related to general concerns such as ecology, mass media, and economism.

In the past decade, there has been the emergence of the so-called "Digital" Architecture. Several currents and design methodologies are being developed simultaneously, some of which reinforce each other, whereas others work in opposition. One of these trends is Biomimicry, which is the process of examining nature, its models, systems, processes, and elements, to emulate or take inspiration from them in order to solve human problems. Architects also design organic-looking buildings in the attempt to develop a new formal language. Another trend is the exploration of those computational techniques that are influenced by algorithms relevant to biological processes and sometimes referred to as Digital morphogenesis. Trying to utilize Computational creativity in architecture, Genetic algorithms developed in computer science are used to evolve designs on a computer, and some of these are proposed and built as actual structures. Since these new architectural tendencies emerged, many theorists and architects have been working on these issues, developing theories and ideas such as Patrick Schumacher's Parametricism.

The theoretical world of contemporary architecture is plural and multifaceted. There are different dominant schools of architectural theory, which are based on linguistic analysis, philosophy, post-structuralism, or cultural theory. For instance, there is emerging interest in the re-discovery of the post-modernist project (Sam Jacob), in the definition of new radical tendencies of architecture and its implication in the development of cities (Pier Vittorio Aureli), in the embrace of the idea of discipline and in a new formalist approach to architecture through the appropriation of concepts from the Object Oriented philosophy. Theories and ideas, such as Patrick Schumacher's Parametricism, a style in contemporary architecture and design that utilizes computational design tools and algorithms to create complex, fluid, and adaptable forms, and Mohammad Habib Reza's New Contextualism, which advocates a layered, justice-oriented, and regenerative approach to architectural and urban design, further reflect the diversity of perspectives. It is too early, however, to say whether any of these explorations will have a widespread or lasting impact on architecture.

In the second decade of the twenty-first century, there is the emergence of architectural theory based on the frameworks of social reproduction theory and care ethics. This approach is introduced in Doina Petrescu's and Kim Trogal's edited a volume on the Social (Re)Production of Architecture and in the volume Critical Care. Architecture and Urbanism for a Broken Planet edited by Angelika Fitz and Elke Krasny.

== Some architectural theorists ==
=== Historical ===
- Vitruvius
- Varāhamihira
- Bhoja
- Li Jie
- Leon Battista Alberti
- Andrea Palladio
- Sebastiano Serlio
- Gérard Desargues
- Filarete
- Francesco di Giorgio Martini
- Teofilo Gallaccini
- Marc-Antoine Laugier
- Antoine-Chrysostome Quatremere de Quincy
- Giambattista Piranesi
- Carlo Lodoli
- Francesco Milizia
- Augustus Pugin
- John Ruskin
- Horatio Greenough
- Eugène Viollet-le-Duc
- Karl Friedrich Schinkel
- Paul Sédille
- Hermann Muthesius
- Frank Lloyd Wright

=== Formalism and space ===
- Hans Auer
- Konrad Fiedler
- Henri Focillon
- Paul Frankl
- Adolf von Hildebrand
- Emil Kaufmann
- Theodor Lipps
- Alois Riegl
- Geoffrey Scott
- August Schmarsow
- Gottfried Semper
- John Summerson
- Robert Vischer
- Heinrich Wölfflin
- Wilhelm Worringer
- Hans Van der Laan

=== Modernist ===
- Reyner Banham
- Ernesto Nathan Rogers
- Bruno Zevi
- Sigfried Giedion
- Leonardo Benevolo
- Steen Eiler Rasmussen
- Otto Wagner
- Le Corbusier
- Adolf Loos
- Lewis Mumford
- Edoardo Persico
- Raymond Unwin
- Ebenezer Howard
- Rudolf Arnheim
- Lúcio Costa
- Frank Lloyd Wright

=== Postmodern and contemporary ===
- Christopher Alexander
- Stan Allen
- Pier Vittorio Aureli
- Michael Benedikt
- Aaron Betsky
- Jennifer Bloomer
- Andrea Branzi
- Lori Brown
- Markus Breitschmid
- Tilmann Buddensieg
- Vera Bühlmann
- Patrizio Ceccarini
- Preston Scott Cohen
- Beatriz Colomina
- Peter Cook (architect)
- Gillo Dorfles
- Nader El-Bizri
- Peter Eisenman
- Hal Foster (art critic)
- Kenneth Frampton
- Marco Frascari
- Sarah Williams Goldhagen
- Jörg Gleiter
- K. Michael Hays
- Hilde Heynen
- Mark Jarzombek
- Charles Jencks
- Jeffrey Kipnis
- Rem Koolhaas
- Elke Krasny
- Leon Krier
- Sanford Kwinter
- Catherine Ingraham
- Sylvia Lavin
- David Leatherbarrow
- Marc Linder
- Harry Francis Mallgrave
- Fritz Neumeyer
- Christian Norberg-Schulz
- Werner Oechslin
- Juhani Pallasmaa
- Alberto Pérez-Gómez
- Paolo Portoghesi
- Mohammad Habib Reza
- Sarah Robinson
- Aldo Rossi
- Colin Rowe
- Joseph Rykwert
- Yehuda Safran
- Denise Scott Brown
- Robert Segrest
- Richard Sennett
- Daniel Sherer
- Robert Somol
- Deyan Sudjic
- Laurent Stalder
- Manfredo Tafuri
- Robert Tavernor
- Panayotis Tournikiotis
- Peter Trummer
- Bernard Tschumi
- Oswald Mathias Ungers
- Robert Venturi
- Dalibor Vesely
- Anthony Vidler
- Paul Virilio
- Sarah Whiting
- Bruno Zevi
- Bahram Shirdel

=== Digital architecture ===
- Ole Bouman
- Mario Carpo
- Mark Foster Gage
- Greg Lynn
- Malcolm McCullough
- Antoine Picon
- Nikos Salingaros
- Patrik Schumacher
- Lars Spuybroek

=== Postdigital architecture ===
- Mel Alexenberg
- Benjamin H. Bratton
- Matias del Campo
- Andrew Kovacs
- Perry Kulper
- Jimenez Lai
- Ryota Matsumoto
- Michael Young

Anti-architecture

- Georges Bataille
- Guy Debord
- Michel Foucault
- Henri Lefebvre

== See also ==
- Vastu shastra
- Phenomenology (architecture)
