= Markus Breitschmid =

Architectural theoretician, architect, and author (born 1966)

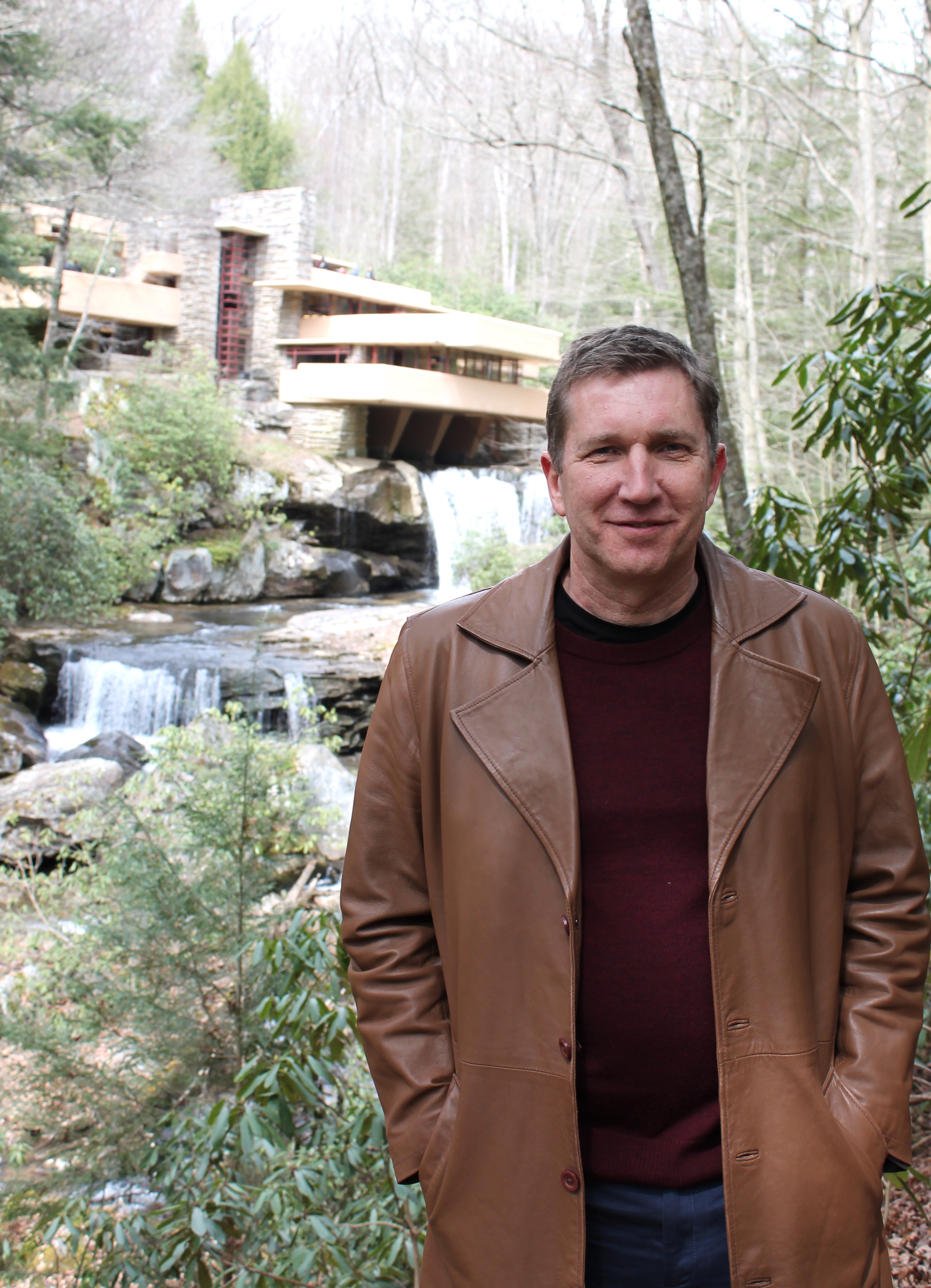
- Born: April 20, 1966 (age 60); Lucerne, Switzerland
- Citizenship: United States
- Education: Technische Universität Berlin (Ph.D)
- Occupation: Architect
- Spouse: Sandra Cruz (m.2001-div.2012)

Markus Breitschmid is an American architectural theoretician, architect, and author who is the T.A. Carter Endowed Professor of Architecture at Virginia Tech and the Inaugural Jacob A. Lutz III Endowed Scholar, the university's premier research award. Breitschmid's international impact in the discipline of architecture stems from a series of books and other writings. His writings have been translated into multiple languages. Breitschmid has been invited to contribute to the Venice Biennale of Architecture, the Architecture Biennale of Chicago, the Salone Internationale del Mobile di Milano in Milan, and the Triennale of Architecture in Lisbon. His work has been exhibited at the Galerie d'Architecture in Paris and the Royal Institute of British Architects in London.

== Biography ==
Breitschmid received his architectural education in Switzerland, the United States, and Germany. He is a registered architect in Switzerland. He received his Philosophiae Doctor (Ph.D.) in engineering science from the Technische Universität Berlin, where he was the first doctoral student of the eminent architectural theoretician Fritz Neumeyer. Breitschmid's doctoral dissertation was reviewed by the prominent architecture historian Wolfgang Pehnt in the leading German daily newspaper, the Frankfurter Allgemeine Zeitung.

Breitschmid operates Markus Breitschmid Architecture LLC in Virginia.

Breitschmid was awarded the American Institute of Architects Henry Adams Gold Medal in 1994. In 2000, Breitschmid was a junior faculty research fellow at the John Paul Getty Research Institute in Los Angeles, California. Breitschmid received a grant from the Graham Foundation for the Advances Studies of the Fine Arts in Chicago in 2007. In 2015, the Colegio de Arquitectos del Perú awarded Breitschmid with its honorary medal for his contributions to the subject of Modernismo Suizo in Lima in 2015. Breitschmid's research and publications have been supported by the public Swiss governmental grant agency Pro Helvetia multiple times. Breitschmid was awarded the inaugural Jacob A. Lutz III Presidential Award for Eminent Scholars for long-term, substantive contributions to research and creative scholarship in the field of art and design in 2024.

== Writings on architecture ==
Breitschmid's writing concerns the aesthetic mentality of modernism and contemporary architecture. Among other subjects, Breitschmid has written books on the German philosopher Friedrich Nietzsche's thoughts on building, contemporary Swiss architecture such as the work of Pritzker-Prize laureates Herzog & de Meuron, Mario Botta, Christ & Gantenbein, as well as several important essay on the work of Bruno Taut, on Tectonics in Architecture, and on Theories of Interpretation. Between 2006 and 2020, Breitschmid wrote numerous books, essays, interviews, and other texts on the work of architect Valerio Olgiati. Breitschmid's books, essays, and interviews in such leading journals as El Croquis (2012), Casabella (2008), and a+u (2010 & 2020) positioned Olgiati's work at the forefront of the architectural discourse. One prominent European critic called Breitschmid "Olgiati's Eckermann," in reference to the collaboration between the two poets Johann Wolfgang von Goethe and Johann Peter Eckermann, in which the latter significantly contributed to the critical reception and recognition of the former.

== Friedrich Nietzsche and Architecture ==
Breitschmid entered the arena of the international discourse on architecture by means of his doctoral dissertation Der Baugedanke bei Friedrich Nietzsche at the Technische Universität Berlin in 1999; it was subsequently published as a German-language book titled Der bauende Geist. Friedrich Nietzsche und die Architektur (The Building Spirit. Friedrich Nietzsche and Architecture). Together with books on Nietzsche by Fritz Neumeyer and Tilmann Buddensieg, Der bauende Geist became the foundation for scholarship on the subject of Nietzsche and architecture. Der bauende Geist was included in Hanno-Walter Kruft's A History of Architectural Theory from Vitruvius to the Present for the revised 2013 edition.

== The Significance of the Idea ==
In her 2012 book Forms of Practice, the Romanian-British architecture historian Irina Davidovici argues that Breitschmid's thesis of The Significance of the Idea – the title of one of Breitschmid's books – is pertinent for all of the contemporary architecture of “post-enlightenment culture.”

== Non-Referential Architecture ==
Since 2013, Breitschmid has propagated Non-Referential Architecture as a response to a contemporary societal current that increasingly rejects ideologies of any kind, political and otherwise. The first use of the term Non-Referential appears in a reprint of an interview written by Breitschmid in the Italian journal Domus. In 2014, Breitschmid published a rebuttal titled "Architecture is Derived from Architecture" (published in German language) in the Swiss journal Werk, Bauen + Wohnen, thereby responding to an architectural claim made by others that attempts to imbue meaning into architecture from the extra-architectural.

Breitschmid wrote the book Non-Referential Architecture. Ideated by Valerio Olgiati. Written by Markus Breitschmid, a treatise on contemporary architecture, during a sabbatical in Ithaca, New York, and in Blacksburg, Virginia, in 2016 and 2017. The manuscript was copyrighted in the USA; the book was published in the original English version and a German translation by Simonett & Baer in Basel in 2018. The book has been published in new editions and several other languages since its first appearance. It analyses the societal currents of the early 21st century and argues that those currents radically differ from the epoch of postmodernity. Contrary to the misconception that the book calls for the abolishment of references in architecture, Breitschmid argues that non-referentiality does not mean that architects would not use references anymore, but rather that architectural references have lost their semantic meaning. The book proposes a new framework for architecture and defines the seven underlying principles – 1) experience of space, 2) oneness, 3) newness, 4) construction, 5) contradiction, 6) order, 7) sensemaking – for a Non-Referential Architecture.

== Published works (selection) ==
=== As author ===
- Der bauende Geist. Friedrich Nietzsche und die Architektur. Quart, 2001. ISBN 978-3-907631-23-2
- Can Architectural Art-Form be Designed Out Of Construction? Architecture Edition, 2004. ISBN 978-0-9702820-8-8
- Nietzsche's Denkraum. Edition Didacta, 2006. Hardcover: ISBN 978-3-033-01206-6 Paperback: ISBN 978-3-033-01148-9
- Between Object and Culture, in: Wolkenkuckucksheim - Cloud-Cuckoo-Land - Vozdushnyi zamo. Eduard Fuehr (ed.), Cottbus: No. 2/2007.
- Three Architects in Switzerland: Beat Consoni – Morger & Degalo – Valerio Olgiati. Quart, 2008. ISBN 978-3-907631-88-1
- Un’architettura che, in fondo, e ‘solo’ astratta, in: Casabella. Francesco Dal Co (ed.), Milano: 72/No.770, 2008, pp. 8–9; 107–108.
- The Significance of the Idea. The Architecture of Valerio Olgiati. / Die Bedeutung der Idee. Die Architektur von Valerio Olgiati. Niggli Verlag, 2008.[Second Print: 2009; Third Print: 2011] ISBN 978-3-7212-0676-0
- El Inventorio Conceptual de Valerio Olgiati / Valerio Olgiati's Ideational Inventory in: El Croquis No.156, 2011. ISBN 978-84-88386-65-6
- The Architect as 'Molder of the Sensibilities of the General Public': Bruno Taut and his Architekturprogramm. in: The Art of Social Critique. Painting Mirrors of Social Life, Lexington Books, 2012. ISBN 978-0-7391-4923-2
- Christ & Gantenbein. Around the Corner. Hatje & Cantz, 2012. ISBN 978-3-7757-3381-6 [co-authored with Victoria Easton]
- Architektur leitet sich von Architektur ab. in: Werk, Bauen + Wohnen, No. 9, Zürich, 2014. ISSN 0257-9332
- Mais Além!. in: Valerio Olgiati. Indexnewspaper, No. 5, Porto, 2016. ISSN 2182-3391
- Bruno Taut - Glass House at Cologne. in: Harry Francis Mallgrave, David Leatherbarrow, Alexander Eisenschmidt (eds.) The Companions to the History of Architecture, Volume IV, Twentieth-Century Architecture, John Wiley & Sons, Inc., London, 2017. ISBN 978-1-444-33851-5
- Non-Referential Architecture. Ideated by Valerio Olgiati; Written by Markus Breitschmid. Basel: Simonett & Baer 2018 ISBN 978-3-906313-19-1
- Nicht-Referenzielle Architektur. Gedacht von Valerio Olgiati; Geschrieben von Markus Breitschmid. Basel: Simonett & Baer 2018 ISBN 978-3-906313-20-7
- Non-Referential Architecture. Ideated by Valerio Olgiati; Written by Markus Breitschmid. 2nd edition, Zurich: Park Books 2019 ISBN 978-3-03860-142-5
- Nicht-Referenzielle Architektur. Gedacht von Valerio Olgiati; Geschrieben von Markus Breitschmid. 2. Auflage, Zürich: Park Books 2019 ISBN 978-3-03860-141-8
- Architettura Non-Referenziale. Ideato da Valerio Olgiati; Scritto da Markus Breitschmid. Zurich: Park Books 2019 ISBN 978-3-03860-143-2
- "Architektur der Berge": Bruno Taut. in: Thinking in Thin Air. Anthology of a Decade Engadin Art Talks, Zurich: Lars Müller Publishers 2020 ISBN 978-3-03778-624-6
- Arquitectura No-Referencial. Ideado por Valerio Olgiati; Escrito por Markus Breitschmid. Ciudad de México: Arquine 2020 ISBN 978-607-9489-74-8
- Ogni edificio esiste per se stesso. in: Domus. No.1054, Milano, 2021 ISSN 0012-5377
- Architecture Non-Référentielle. Idéé par Valerio Olgiati; Ecrit par Markus Breitschmid. Marseille: Cosa Mentale 2021 ISBN 978-2-491039-12-7
- 비참조적 건축. 구상 Valerio Olgiati; 저술 Markus Breitschmid. Seoul: Hoi 2023 ISBN 979-11-972696-9-1
- Theodor Cron. Stanze italiane / Italian Rooms. Cura di / Edited by Markus Breitschmid, Enrico Molteni. Rome: Quodlibet 2024 ISBN 978-88-229-2169-7
- Ein Gefühl für das Gesamte - Un Sentiment d'Ensamble. Herzog & de Meuron, Powerhouse Arts, Brooklyn, New York. in: Swiss arc mag. Zeitschrift für Architektur-Revue d'architecture. No.5, Zürich, 2024, pp. 66–77 ISSN 3042-4666
- Built Sublimation. in: Christ & Gantenbein Projects I-III, Cologne: Verlag der Buchhandlung Walther und Franz König, 2024, pp. 167–173 ISBN 978-37-533-0601-8

=== As editor ===
- Conversation with Students – Valerio Olgiati. Virginia Tech Architecture Publications, 2007. ISBN 978-0-9794296-3-7
- A Modern Milieu – Julius Meier-Graefe. Architectura et Ars Series, Volume 1, Virginia Tech Architecture Publications, 2007. ISBN 978-0-9794296-0-6
- Thoughts on Building. Corporis Publisher for Architecture, Art, and Photography, 2008. ISBN 978-0-9795472-8-7
- Olgiati. English Edition. Birkhäuser, 2011. ISBN 978-3-0346-0783-4 (text edited with Leina Gonzalez; also available in German, French, Italian, Spanish, and Japanese editions)
- Architecture and the Ambient – Mario Botta. Architectura et Ars Series, Volume 2, Virginia Tech Architecture Publications, 2013. ISBN 978-0-9893936-5-2
