= Mary Louise Lobsinger =

Canadian architectural historian

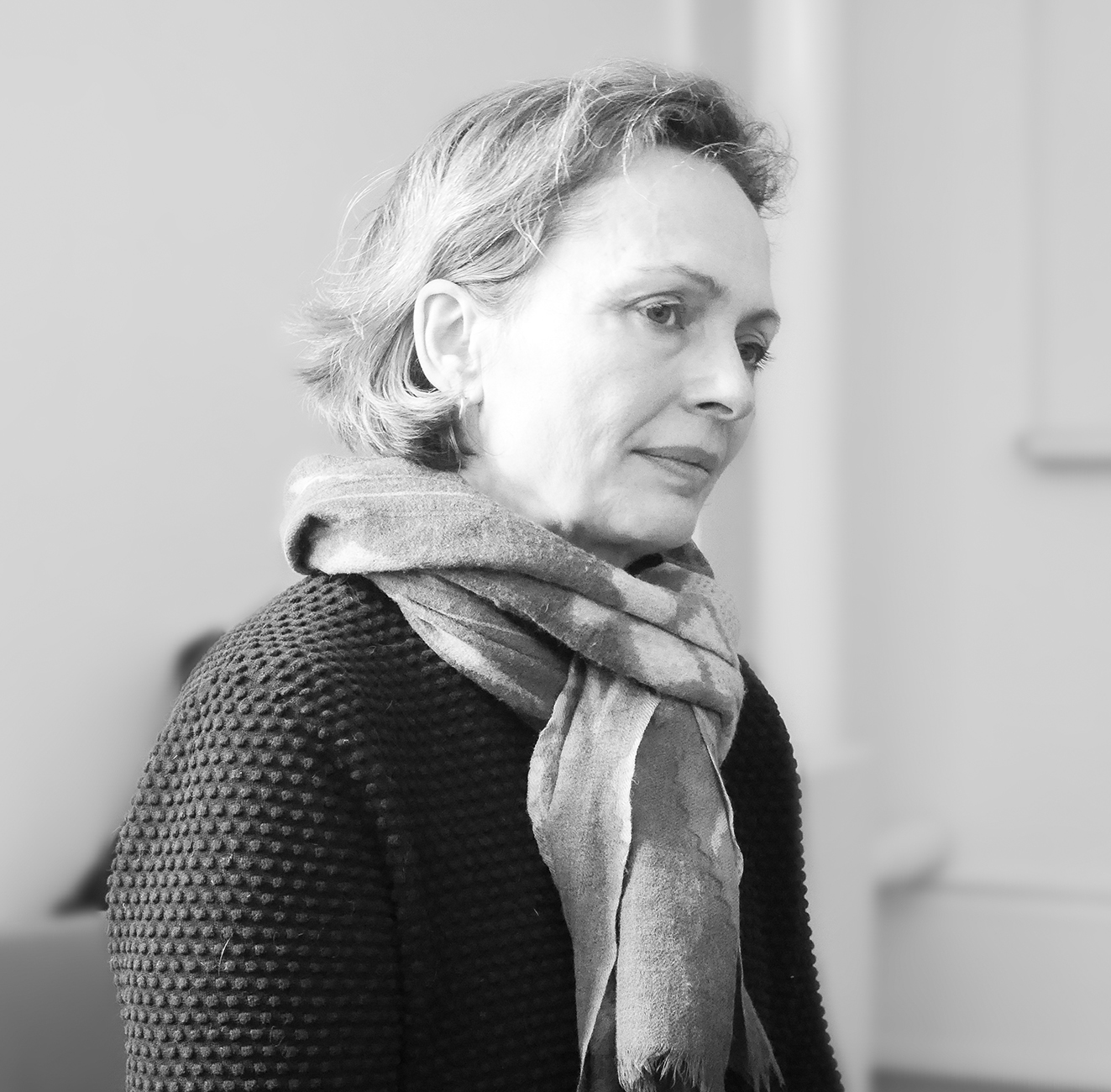
- Lobsinger speaking with students after a graduate review at the University of Toronto
- Born: Canada
- Education: PhD, MDes Harvard University, B.Arch University of Waterloo, B.A. Fine Arts University of Guelph
- Occupation: Architectural Historian
- Known for: Architectural history, architectural theory

Mary Louise Lobsinger is a Toronto-based architectural historian, artist, and architect. She was an associate professor at the University of Toronto, where she teaches the history and theory of architecture and design.

== Education and academic career ==
She holds a B.A. in Fine Arts from the University of Guelph (1976-1980), a B.Arch from the University of Waterloo (1982-1989), an M.DeS from Harvard University (1994-1995), and a PhD from Harvard University (1995-2003). She has taught at design schools in Canada, the United States, and in Europe, most notably at the Harvard Graduate School of Design and University of Toronto.

Lobsinger's creative practice includes text-based visual works and the production of environments for multi-disciplinary experiments between theory and praxis.

=== Publications and awards ===
She has written extensively on the histories and theories of modern architecture and urbanism. Her research centers around issues of historiography, science, technology, and techniques of articulation. Her research on Cedric Price and cybernetics has had a significant impact and has been published widely. She has also made important contributions to the topic of post-war Italian architecture and written extensively about the work of Aldo Rossi. In 2006, she was a visiting scholar at the Canadian Centre for Architecture and presented her research titled "The Fortune of Aldo Rossi within Critical Architectural Discourse in the 1970s." She has held fellowships and received awards from the Canadian Centre for Architecture, the Graham Foundation, the Social Science and Research Council, ACSA/JAE/AIA, the Canada Council for the Arts, the Toronto Arts Council, the Ontario Design Council, the Graduate School of Design, and the Graduate School of Arts and Sciences at Harvard University.
