= Dietrich C. Neumann =

German architectural historian, author, and professor

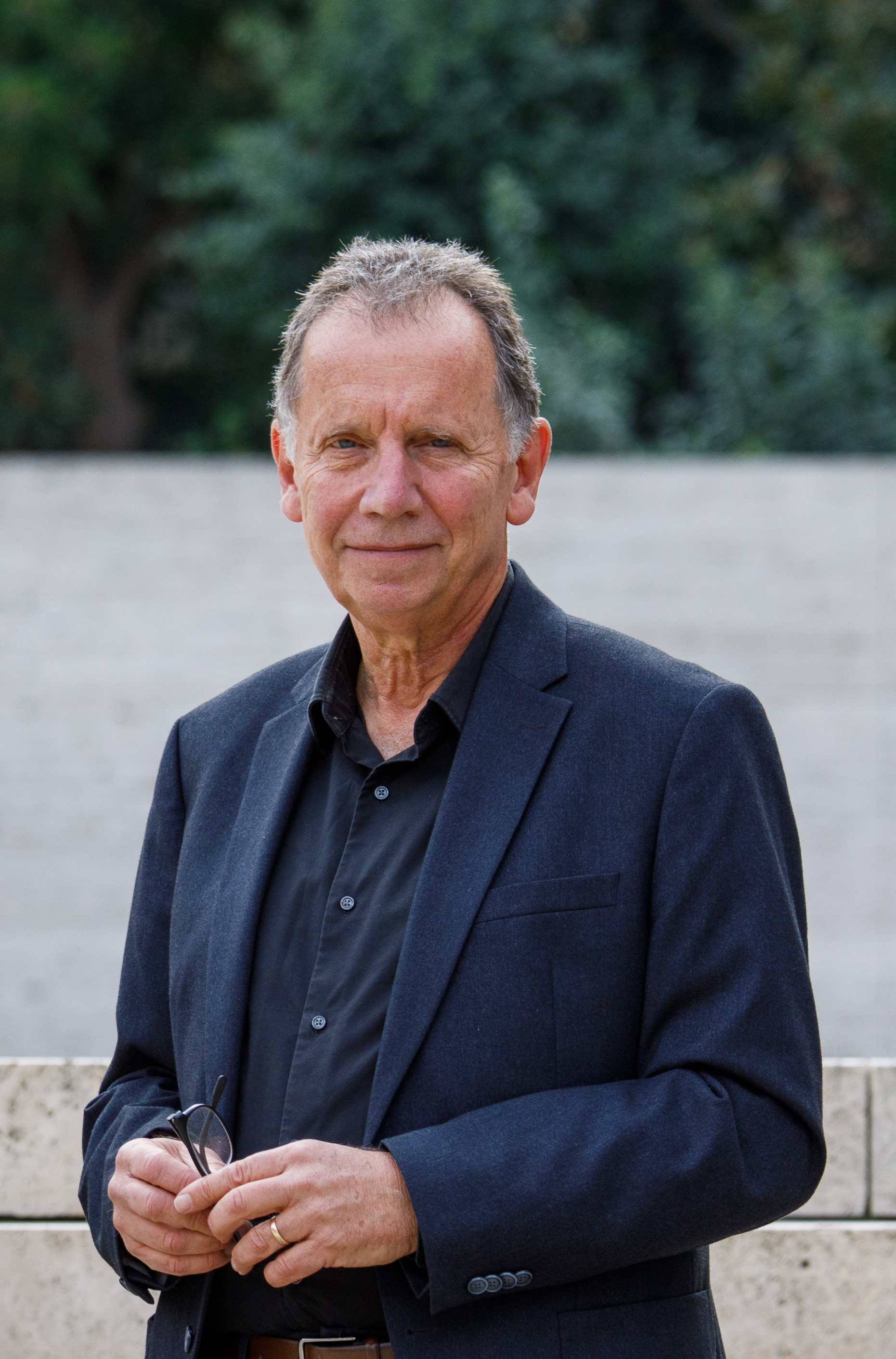
- Neumann in 2023
- Born: Göttingen, Germany
- Occupations: Architectural Historian; Curator; Professor; Author
- Writing career
- Notable awards: Society of Architectural Historians Founder's Award (1996); Philip Johnson Award (2003); SAH Fellow (2018); PROSE Award (2025)

Dietrich C. Neumann is a German-American architectural historian, curator, and professor specializing in modern architecture, urbanism, and building technology. He is the Christopher Chan and Michelle Ma Professor of the History of Modern Architecture and Urbanism at Brown University, where he has taught since 1990. He is trained as an architect at the Architectural Association School of Architecture in London and earned his PhD from the Technical University of Munich. He has held visiting professorships at the Yale School of Architecture, the Faculdade de Arquitectura at the Universidade do Porto, and the Chinese University of Hong Kong. Neumann has published widely on film set design, architectural illumination, unbuilt architecture, and the work of Ludwig Mies van der Rohe.

== Research ==
Neumann's research has focused on European and American architecture since the late 19th century. Several of his monographs on individual buildings examine the social, economic, legal, political, and stylistic contexts of architectural production. Reception studies have taken an increasing role in his work, particularly in relation to the German-American architect Ludwig Mies van der Rohe. Neumann has authored or edited more than fifteen books and over 120 articles published in journals and anthologies including Journal of the Society of Architectural Historians, Domus, Architectural Record, Bauwelt, A+U, Metropolis and Docomomo Journal.

== Awards and fellowships ==
Neumann has held fellowships and residencies at the Canadian Centre for Architecture in Montréal, the Institute for Advanced Study in Princeton University, and the American Academies in Berlin and Rome. He received the Society of Architectural Historians Founder's Award in 1996 and the Philip Johnson Award in 2003, later serving as the organization's president from 2008 to 2010 and being named a fellow in 2018. He has also received grants from the Graham Foundation and the National Endowment for the Humanities. His biography of Ludwig Mies van der Rohe won a PROSE Award from the Association of American Publishers. Neumann is a member of the Committee on Architecture and Design at the Museum of Modern Art in New York and currently serves as president of Docomomo New England.

== Academic career ==
Neumann served as Director of Urban Studies at Brown University from 2014 to 2020 and as Director of the John Nicholas Brown Center for Public Humanities and Cultural Heritage from 2020 to 2023. In 2015, he founded Brown's undergraduate architecture program and served as its inaugural director.

== Curation ==
Neumann has curated or co-curated numerous exhibitions at museums and galleries in Europe and the United States, including:

- Film Architecture: Set Design from Metropolis to Blade Runner (1996, Bell Gallery, Brown University; Academy of Motion Picture Arts and Sciences, Los Angeles; Filmmuseum and Architekturmuseum, Frankfurt)
- Richard Neutra's Windshield House (2002, Harvard University Art Museums; RISD Museum; Heinz Architectural Center, Pittsburgh; National Building Museum, Washington, D.C.)
- Unbuilt Providence (2004, Bell Gallery, Brown University)
- Friedrich St. Florian (2006, Bell Gallery, Brown University)
- Luminous Buildings: Architecture of the Night (2007, Kunstmuseum Stuttgart; Netherlands Architecture Institute, Rotterdam; co-curated with Marion Ackermann)
- Raymond Hood and the American Skyscraper (2020, Bell Gallery, Brown University; co-curated with Jon Duval)
- Baubilder und Erinnerungsmuster: Mies van der Rohe's Memorials (2022, Mies van der Rohe Haus, Berlin; co -curated with Simon Behringer and Wita Noack)
- Politics and Architecture: Mies van der Rohe Pavilion Barcelona (2023, Barcelona Pavilion, Barcelona)
- Edward Mitchell Bannister: A Black Artist in 19th Century New England (forthcoming; co-curated with Sara Picard)

== Bibliography ==
=== Books ===
His books and edited volumes span topics from film set design and architectural illumination to landmark studies on Ludwig Mies van der Rohe, including:

- Mies van der Rohe: An Architect in His Time (New Haven: Yale University Press, 2024)
- Politics and Architecture (Barcelona: Fundación Mies van der Rohe, 2023)
- Ludwig Mies van der Rohe: Villa Wolf in Guben. Geschichte und Rekonstruktion (Berlin: D.O.M. Publishers, 2021; editor, co-author, co-translator; second German edition, hardcover, and Polish and English editions, 2023)
- The Barcelona Pavilion by Mies van der Rohe: One Hundred Texts since 1929 (Basel: Birkhäuser, 2020; with David Caralt)
- An Accidental Masterpiece: The Barcelona Pavilion by Mies van der Rohe (Basel: Birkhäuser, 2020; with David Caralt)
- Cities of Light: 200 Years of Urban Illumination (London: Routledge, 2014; co-editor and contributor)
- Luminous Buildings: Architecture of the Night (Stuttgart: Hatje Cantz, 2006; co-editor and contributor)
- Architecture of the Night: The Illuminated Building (Munich/New York: Prestel, 2002; editor, translator of German edition, and co-author)
- Richard Neutra's Windshield House (New Haven: Yale University Press, 2001; editor and co-author)
- Film Architecture: From Metropolis to Blade Runner (Munich/New York: Prestel, 1996; paperback edition, 1999; editor, co-author, translator of German edition, exhibition curator)
- The Structure of Light: Richard Kelly and the Illumination of Modern Architecture (New Haven/London: Yale University Press, 2010; editor and contributor)
- Mies van der Rohe: Barcelona 1929 (Barcelona: Fundació Mies van der Rohe / Editorial Tenov, 2018; contributor). Contributions include: Dietrich C. Neumann, Remei Capdevila-Werning, Beatriz Colomina, Juan José Lahuerta, Laura Martínez de Guereñu, Fritz Neumeyer, Spyros Papapetros, Lutz Robbers, and Carmen Rodríguez Pedret.

=== Articles ===
- Grewe, Cordula & Dietrich Neumann (2005). "From Manhattan to Mainhattan : reconsidering the Transatlantic architectural dialogue" (PDF). Bulletin of the German Historical Institute. Supplement 2: 1–12.

———————

Bibliography notes
