= Aesthetic Theory: Essential Texts =

2011 anthology

- Editor: Mark Foster Gage
- Language: English
- Subject: Aesthetics, Theory of art, Art criticism
- Publisher: W. W. Norton & Company
- Publication date: 2011
- Publication place: The United States
- ISBN: 978-0-393-73349-5

Aesthetic Theory: Essential Texts is an anthology of the most important texts written on aesthetics and beauty since Plato till nowadays.

It is edited by the theorist Mark Foster Gage who is tenured associate professor at the Yale University. The book is made up of twenty chapters each about an influential figure in the field of aesthetics. Also, the editor himself has added some descriptions before each chapter, summarizing how each figure's thought could be related to contemporary thinking.

== Summary ==
Covering the history of aesthetic philosophy since the ancient Greek up to 21st century, the twenty chapters includes texts from thinkers as diverse as Plato, Aristotle, Vitruvius, Alberti, Kant, Edmund Burke, Konrad Fiedler, Nietzsche, Oscar Wilde, Henri Bergson, Clive Bell, Geoffrey Scott, Walter Benjamin, Georges Bataille, Susan Sontag, Frederic Jameson, Elaine Scarry, Alexander Nehamas, Nick Zangwill, and David Freedberg & Vittorio Gallese.

The selection mostly focuses on the issue of the form in visual arts and tries to question the prevailing practice of only qualifying our work based on concepts and in abstract terms.

In the preface of the book we read:

The selections here are from philosophy, art history, literary criticism, architectural practice, Renaissance scholarship, critical theory, and the cognitive neurosciences. Some are complete book chapters or essays, and some surgically extracted excerpts from writings primarily focused on topics seemingly distant from aesthetic theory, yet all offer insights into the importance of considering form relative to its aesthetic qualities and influence.
