= Valerio Olgiati =

Swiss architect (born 1958)

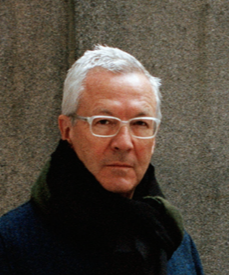
Valerio Olgiati

Valerio Olgiati (born 18 July 1958 in Cours, Switzerland) is a Swiss architect. His projects include the School Building in Paspels and the Yellow House Museum in Flims.

== Biography ==
He studied architecture at ETH Zurich, a public research university in Zürich, Switzerland.

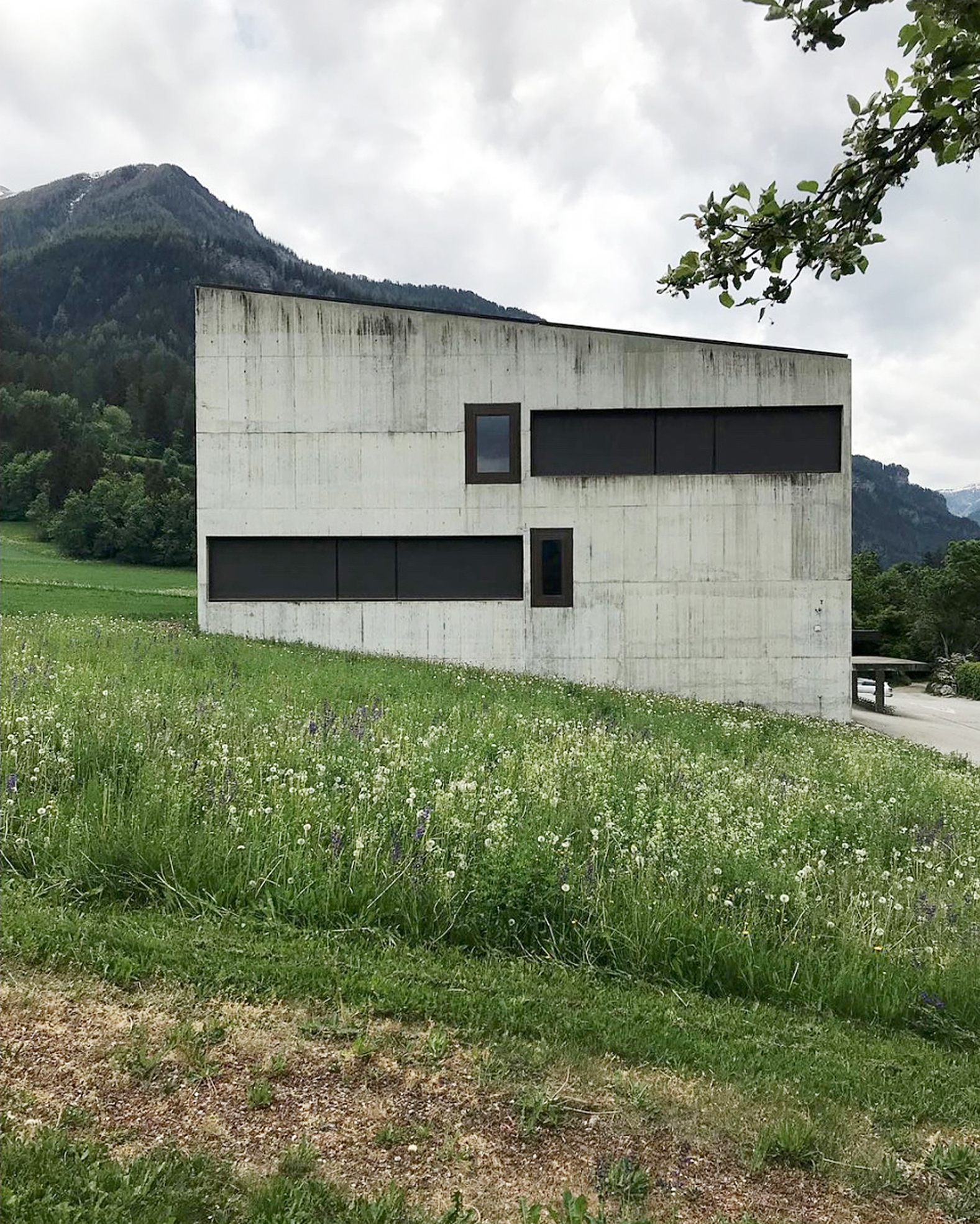
Schoolhouse Paspels

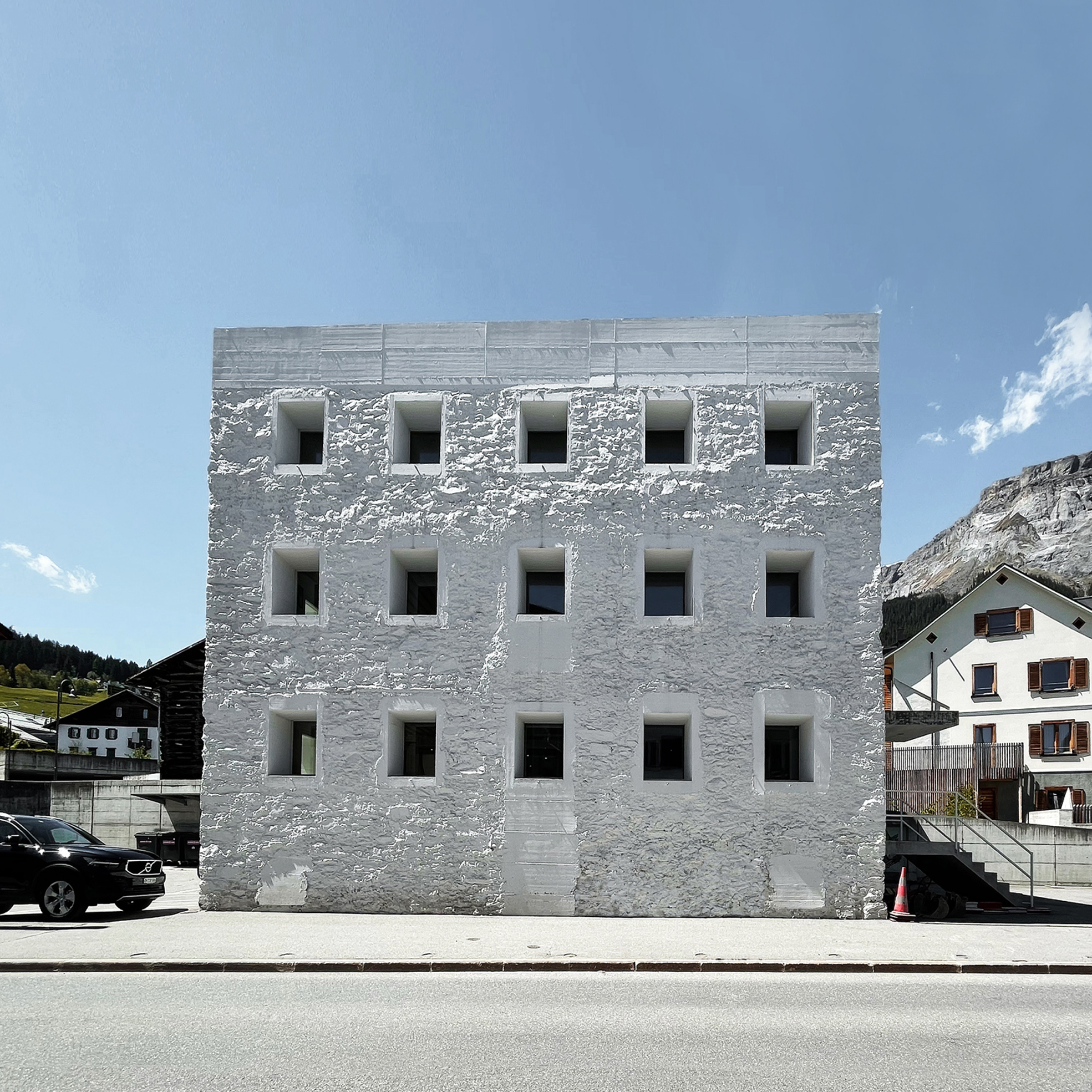
Yellow House, Flims

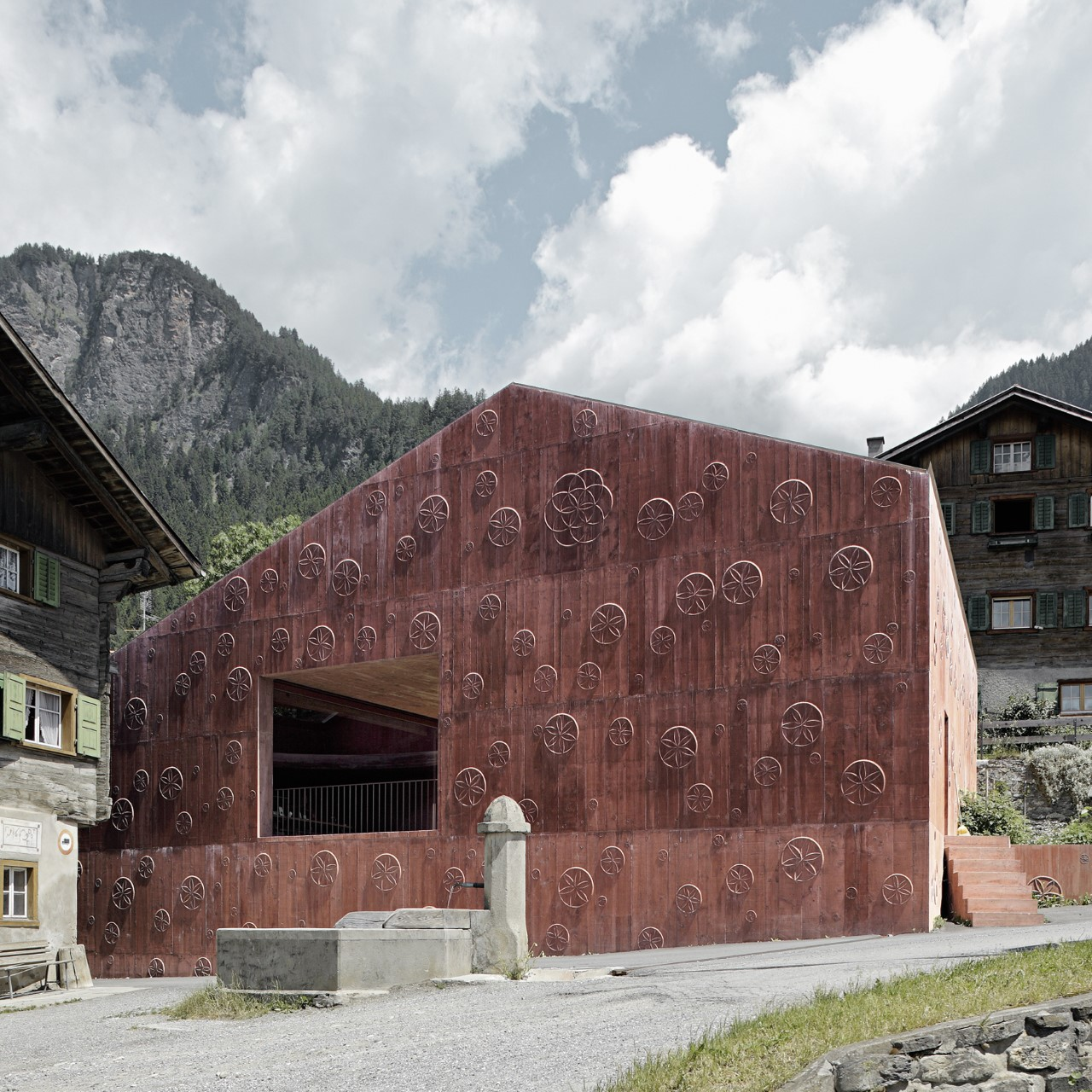
Atelier Bardill, Scharans

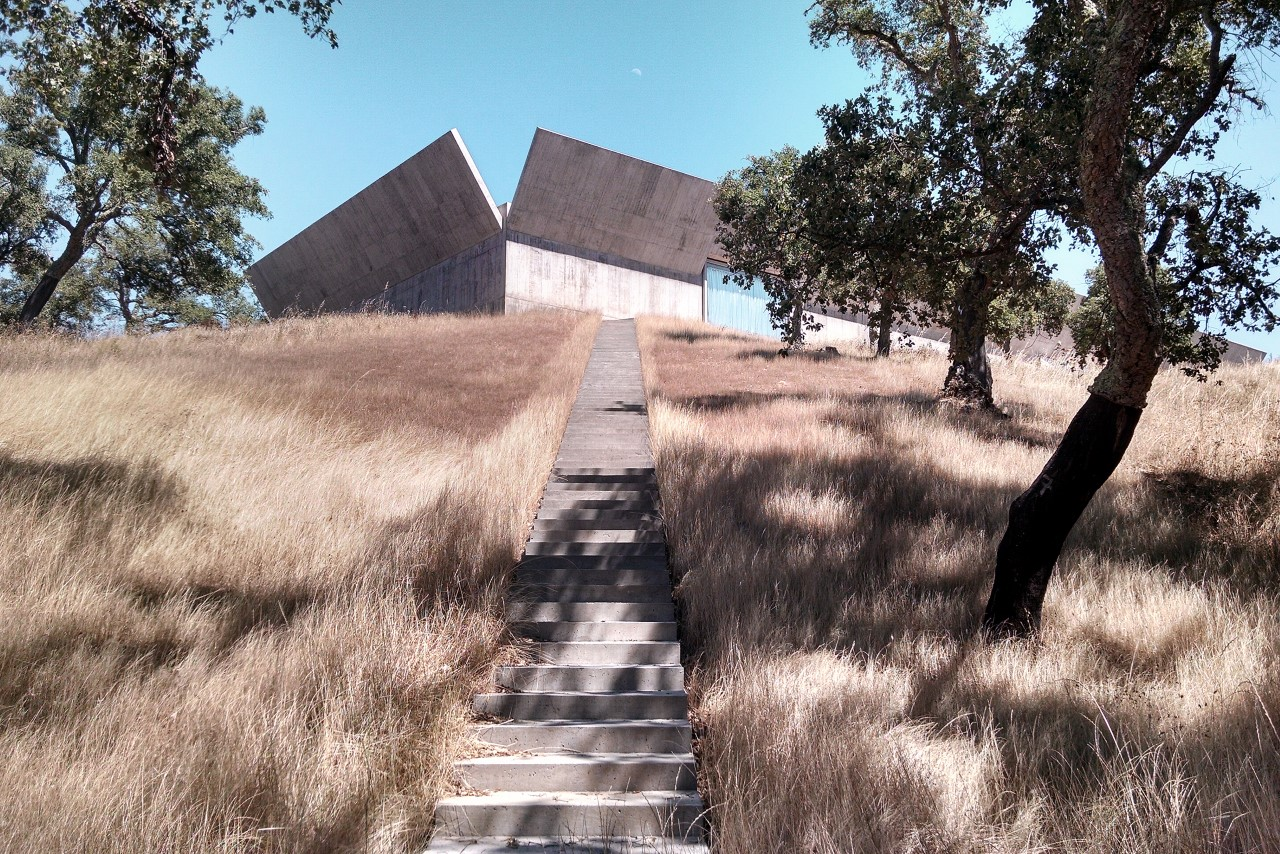
Villa Além, Alentejo

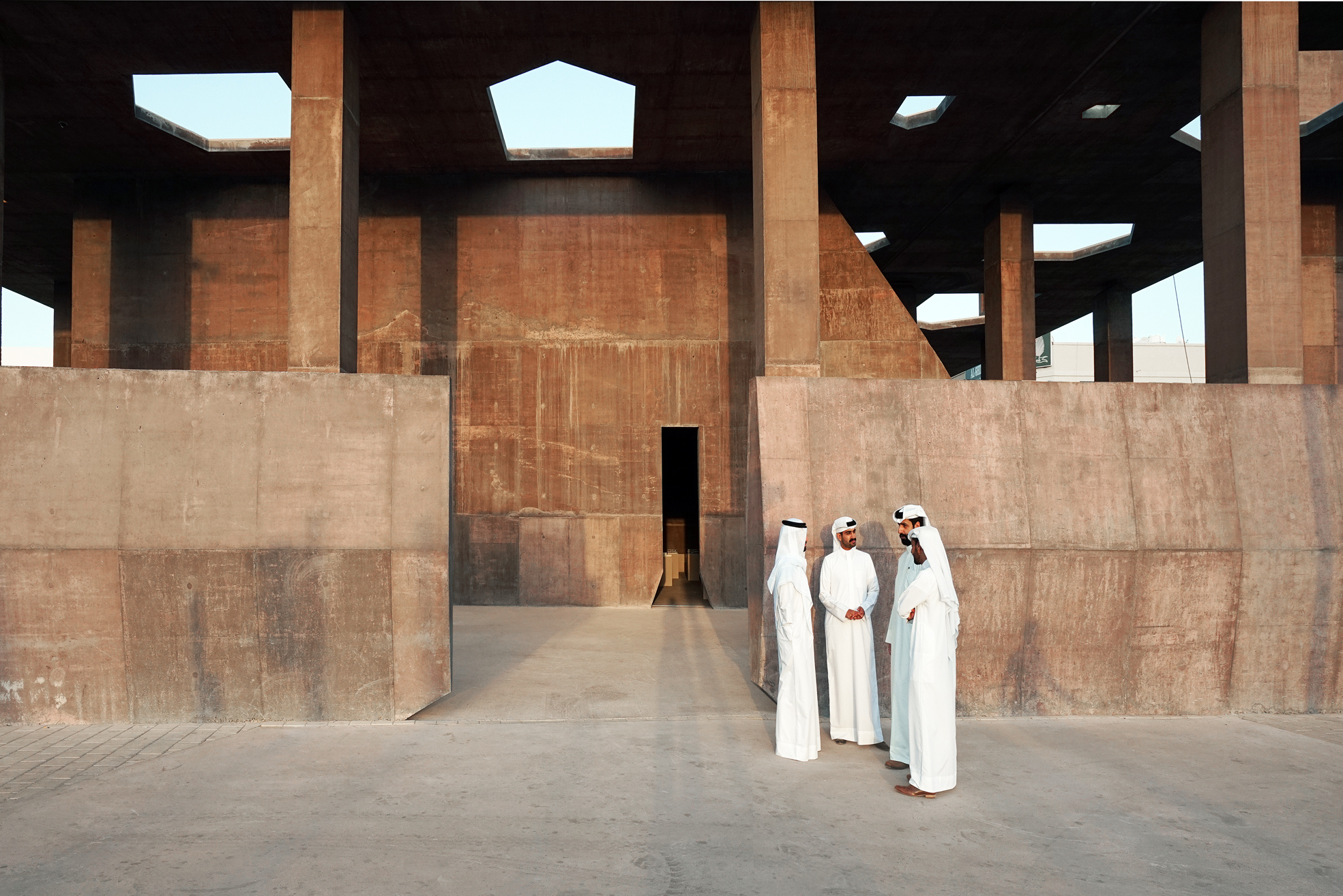
UNESCO World Heritage Pearling Site Visiting Center, Muharraq

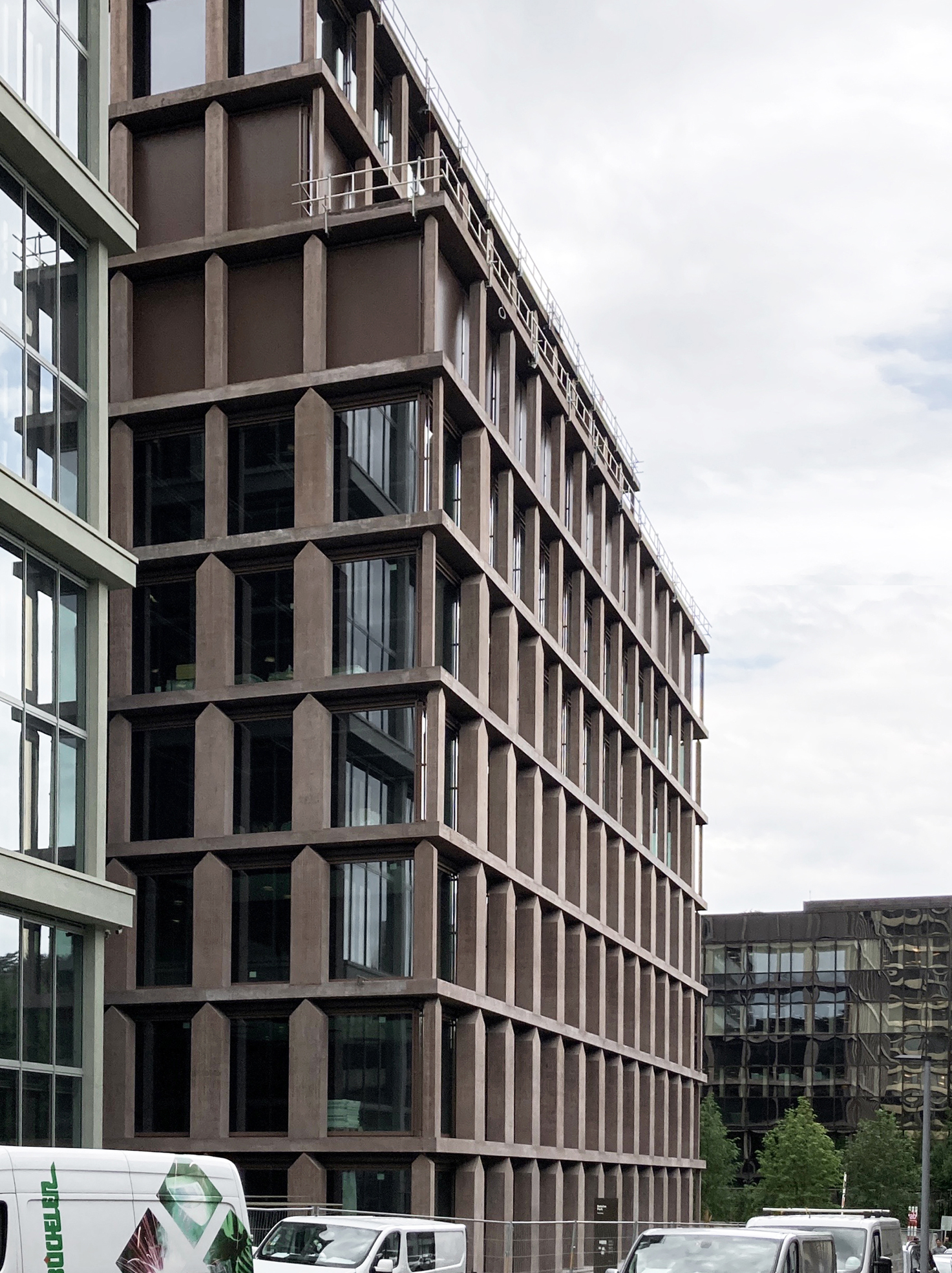
Baloise Insurance Building, Basel

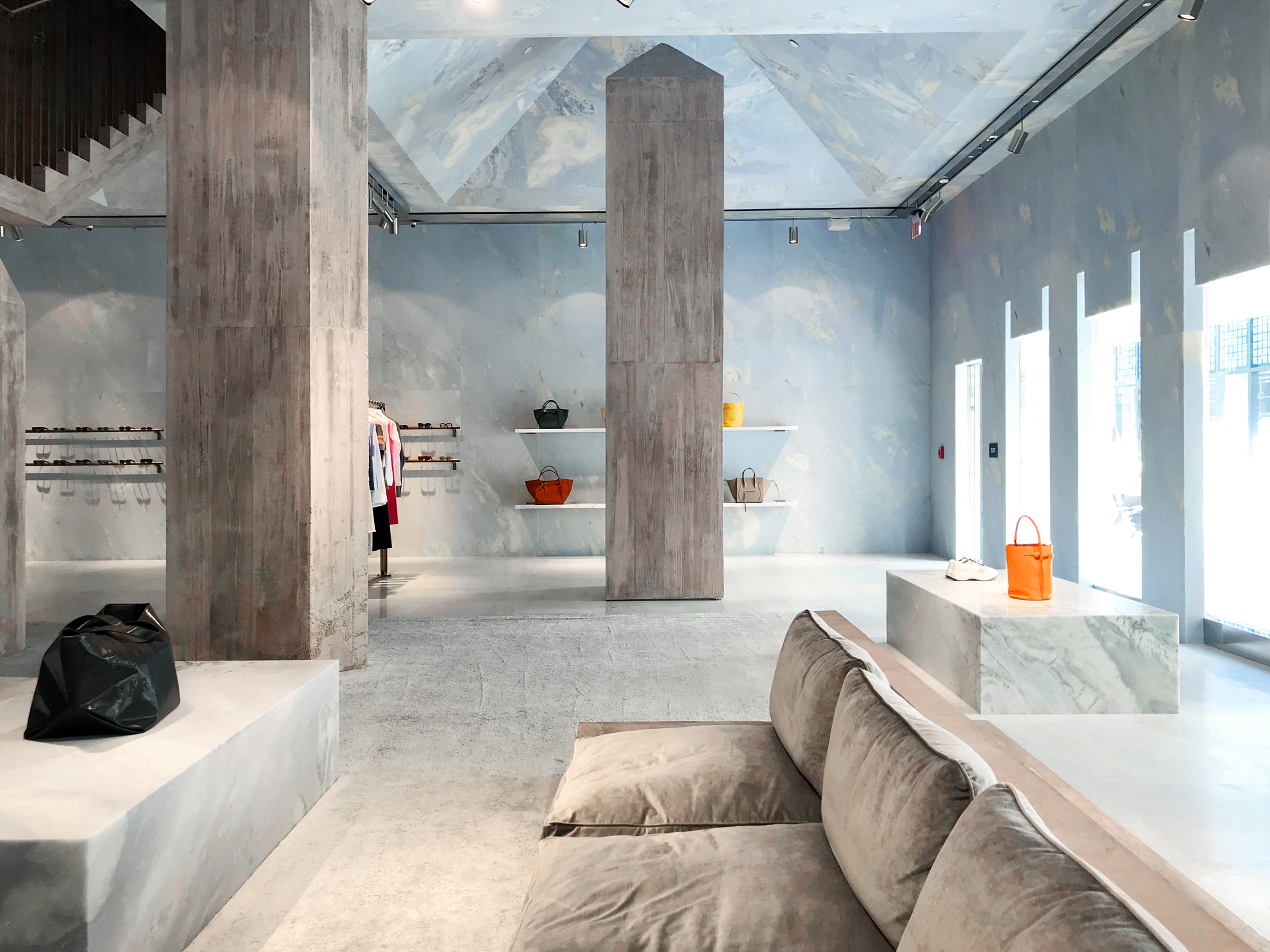
Celine flagship store, Miami

Olgiati describes his approach to his work as "non-referential architecture," which is also the title of a 2018 treatise by Olgiati and architectural theorist Markus Breitschmid and discussing the social purpose of architecture.The term "Non-Referential Architecture" is a registered trademark registered by Valerio Olgiati.

Olgiati has stated that his immigration to Los Angeles was the most important step in his architectural formation, an event he claims to be more significant than his architectural education. According to Olgiati, living in the United States allowed him to understand the world in formal, natural terms rather than symbolic or historical ones.

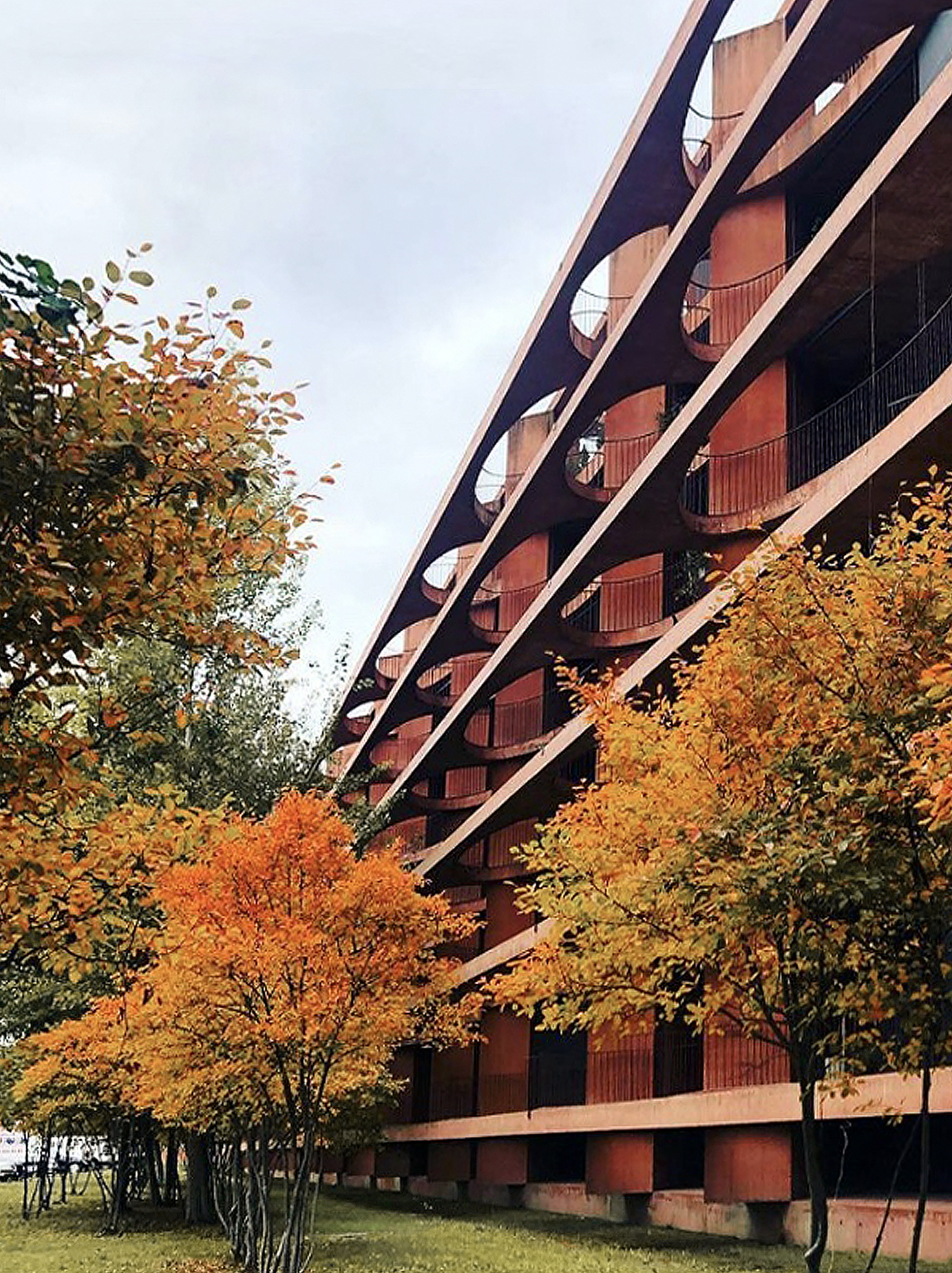
Zug-Schleife, Zug

This shift in perspective, which moved away from grounding architecture in tradition, was theoretically expressed in his Iconographic Autobiography, published in 2006. Iconographic Autobiography is an anthology of 55 illustrations that foreshadow non-referential architecture. The author intentionally presents the references in his work as devoid of inherent meaning. Olgiati holds the perspective that only fundamental insights from spatial experience can advance contemporary architecture in today's diverse societies.

Valerio Olgiati operates his architecture office with his wife Tamara in Portugal and Switzerland. His work has been featured in solo exhibitions and at institutions including the National Museum of Modern Art, the Royal Institute of British Architects in London, and the Colegio de San Ildefonso in Mexico City. Olgiati has also held teaching positions at Harvard University (Kenzo Tange Chair), ETH Zürich, Cornell University, and the AA in London. He has held a professorial position at the Accademia di Architettura in Mendrisio since 2002.

== Monographs ==
- 비참조적 건축. 구상 Valerio Olgiati; 저술 Markus Breitschmid. Seoul: Hoi 2023 ISBN 979-11-972696-9-1
- Valerio Olgiati. a+u, No.601, Tokyo, 10/2020 ISBN 978-4-900212-56-5
- Arquitectura No-Referencial. Ideado por Valerio Olgiati; Escrito por Markus Breitschmid. Ciudad de México: Arquine 2020 ISBN 978-607-9489-74-8
- Architettura Non-Referenziale. Ideato da Valerio Olgiati; Scritto da Markus Breitschmid. Zurich: Park Books 2019 ISBN 978-3-03860-143-2
- Nicht-Referenzielle Architektur. Gedacht von Valerio Olgiati; Geschrieben von Markus Breitschmid. 2. Auflage, Zürich: Park Books 2019 ISBN 978-3-03860-141-8
- Non-Referential Architecture. Ideated by Valerio Olgiati; Written by Markus Breitschmid. 2nd edition, Zurich: Park Books 2019 ISBN 978-3-03860-142-5
- Nicht-Referenzielle Architektur. Gedacht von Valerio Olgiati; Geschrieben von Markus Breitschmid. Basel: Simonett & Baer 2018 ISBN 978-3-906313-20-7
- Non-Referential Architecture. Ideated by Valerio Olgiati; Written by Markus Breitschmid. Basel: Simonett & Baer 2018 ISBN 978-3-906313-19-1
- Valerio Olgiati. Projekte 2009-2017. Basel: Simonett & Baer 2017 ISBN 978-3-906313-14-6
- Valerio Olgiati, The Idea of Architecture, Ciudad de México, Arquine 2018
- The Images of Architects, Editor Valerio Olgiati, Quart Verlag GmbH, Luzern 2013, ISBN 978-3-03761-069-5
- World Architecture, VALERIO OLGIATI - Hello China, Beijing, Nr. 266, 2012, ISSN 1002-4832
- A Lecture by Valerio Olgiati, Birkhäuser Verlag Basel, Switzerland 2011; English: ISBN 978-3-0346-0783-4; German: ISBN 978-3-0346-0782-7; Spanish: ISBN 978-3-0346-0787-2; French: ISBN 978-3-0346-0784-1; Italian: ISBN 978-3-0346-0785-8; ヴァレリオ ・ オルジャティ 講演録, ISBN 978-3-0346-0786-5, 108 pages
- Valerio Olgiati at the Museum / ヴァレリオ・オルジャティ展, Editor Hosaka Kenjiro, National Museum of Modern Art, Tokyo, Japan 2011–2012; Japanese and English: ISBN 978-4-9902409-3-6, 40 pages
- El Croquis #156, Valerio Olgiati 1996–2011, croquis editorial Madrid, Spain 2011; ISSN 0212-5633, ISBN 978-84-88386-65-6, 215 pages
- Valerio Olgiati, Parliament Entrance Chur, editor Grisons Building Department, Switzerland 2011; German: ISBN 978-3-9523831-0-0; English: ISBN 978-3-9523831-3-1; Italian: ISBN 978-3-9523831-1-7; Romansh: ISBN 978-3-9523831-2-4, 24 pages
- Valerio Olgiati, Weber Auditorium Plantahof, editor Grisons Building Department, Switzerland 2011; German: ISBN 978-3-9523831-4-8; English: ISBN 978-3-9523831-5-5, 24 pages
- Darco Magazine, monograph Valerio Olgiati, Darco Editions, Matosinhos, Portugal, 2010; ISSN 1646-950X, 236 pages
- Dado, Built and Inhabited by Rudolf Olgiati and Valerio Olgiati, Birkhäuser Verlag, Basel, 2010; English: ISBN 978-3-0346-0430-7, German: ISBN 978-3-0346-0375-1, 100 pages
- Valerio Olgiati, edited by Laurent Stalder, Texts by Mario Carpo, Bruno Reichlin and Laurent Stalder, Verlag der Buchhandlung Walther König, Köln 2008 (1st Edition) / Quart Verlag, Luzern 2010 (2nd edition); German: ISBN 978-3-03761-031-2, English: ISBN 978-3-03761-030-5, 192 pages
- The Significance of the Idea in the Architecture of Valerio Olgiati, Text in German and English by Markus Breitschmid, Verlag Niggli AG, Switzerland 2008, ISBN 978-3-7212-0676-0, 80 pages
- Valerio Olgiati, Scharans - House for a Musician, Edition Dino Simonett, Zurich 2007, ISBN 978-3-905562-54-5, 64 pages
- Valerio Olgiati, Conversation with Students, Edited by Markus Breitschmid, Virginia Tech Architecture Publications, USA, 2007, ISBN 978-0-9794296-3-7, 63 pages
- 2G, Valerio Olgiati, Gustavo Gili Barcelona, n.37, 2006, ISBN 978-84-252-2088-3, 143 pages with contributions from Pascal Flammer, Patrick Gartmann, Jacques Lucan and Raphael Zuber
- Valerio Olgiati, PLAN 1:100, Edition Dino Simonett, 2004, ISBN 3-905562-13-8, 64 pages
- Valerio Olgiati, Das Gelbe Haus, Kunsthaus Bregenz, archiv kunst architektur, Werkdokumente 19, 2000, Verlag Gerd Hatje, ISBN 3-7757-1004-3, 82 pages
- 14 Studentenprojekte bei Valerio Olgiati 1998 - 2000, Quart Verlag, 2000, ISBN 3-907631-04-8, 66 pages
- VALERIO OLGIATI, Das Gelbe Haus, Publikation zur Ausstellung an der ETH Zürich 28. Mai - 15. Juli 1999, gta Verlag, ETH Zürich, ISBN 3-85676-091-1, 18 pages, design: Raphael Zuber
- Valerio Olgiati, PASPELS, Edition Dino Simonett, 1998, ISBN 3-9521375-5-3, 65 pages
