= Hilde Heynen =

Architectural theoreticians

- Born: 26 May 1959 (age 67); Deurne
- Education: Katholieke Universiteit Leuven
- Occupation: Professor
- Employer: Katholieke Universiteit Leuven

Hilde Heynen (born 26 May 1959 in Deurne) is professor of architectural theory at the Katholieke Universiteit Leuven. She researches modernism, modernity, and gender in architecture. Heynen is the author of several books and publishes regularly in architectural journals such as the Harvard Design Magazine, The Journal of Architecture, and The Architectural Review of which she is a member of the editorial board. She is also a board member of the European Association of Architectural Education (EAAE) and the Society of Architectural Historians (SAH).

Heynen is a member of the Royal Flemish Academy of Belgium for Science and the Arts since 2009.

== Academic career ==
She has graduated from Katholieke Universiteit Leuven where she has studied both philosophy and architecture. She has also spent some time in J. Paul Getty Foundation as a Postdoctoral Fellow. Beside being a professor of architecture theory at the Katholieke Universiteit Leuven, Heynen works with Massachusetts Institute of Technology, the Architectural Association School of Architecture in London, and RMIT University in Melbourne as visiting professor.

== Books ==
- Architecture and Modernity: A Critique. MIT Press, 1999
- Dat is architectuur. Sleutelteksten uit de 20ste eeuw (co-editor). 010 Publishers, 2001
- Back from Utopia. The Challenge of the Modern Movement. 010 Publishers, 2002
- Inside Density. La Lettre Volée, 2003
- Negotiating Domesticity. Routledge, 2005
- The SAGE Handbook of Architectural Theory, SAGE Publications, 2011.
- Sibyl Moholy-Nagy: Architecture, Modernism and its Discontents, Bloomsbury Academic, 2019.

== Grants ==
- The Research Foundation Flanders
- The Research Council of the Katholieke Universiteit Leuven
- The Netherlands Architecture Fund
- Graham Foundation for Advanced Studies in the Fine Arts.
