= Architecture and Modernity: A Critique =

Non-fiction architecture book

- Language: English
- Subject: Architectural Criticism, Critical Theory, Theory and History of Architecture
- Publisher: The MIT Press
- Publication date: 1999
- Publication place: The United States of America

Architecture and Modernity: A Critique is a 1999 architecture book by the architectural theoretician and historian Hilde Heynen.

Starting from the first decades of the 20th century, Heynen attempts to examine the relationship between critical theory and modern architecture. The book traces two main strains, one from critical theory introduced by The Frankfurt School and philosophers such as Walter Benjamin, Theodor Adorno, Ernst Bloch, Max Horkheimer, and the other modern architecture originally put forth in Frankfurt by work of architects such as Adolf Loos, Ernst May, Hannes Meyer and historians such as Sigfried Giedion, Bruno Zevi, etc.

Architecture and Modernity, besides attempting to bridge the gap between architectural Theory and the discourse of critical theory, presents a clear history of modernism in architecture, exploring the works of avantgardes such as Constant Nieuwenhuys, Situationist International, Manfredo Tafuri, Max Bill, Guy Debord, Massimo Cacciari, and Francesco Dal Co.

Hilde Heynen`s book is consisting of four chapters: "Architecture Facing Modernity", "Constructing the Modern Movement", "Reflections in a Mirror", and "Architecture as Critique of Modernity. The first chapter discusses the concepts of modernity and draws up the question “how does architecture relate to modernity”, which is answered in later chapters. The second chapter examines the works of Sigfried Giedion and Ernst May as cases for practical architecture that challenged modernity by adding elements of the avant-garde art and literature while adhering to traditional architectural values such as harmony and persistence.

== Summary ==
The book consists of four chapters:

- Architecture Facing Modernity
- Constructing the Modern Movement
- Reflections in a Mirror
- Architecture as Critique of Modernity

and in afterward it discusses on concepts of Dwelling, Mimesis, and Culture.

== Criticism ==
Professor of Architectural Theory at Harvard University, K. Michael Hays pointed out on this book:

At a moment of startling intensity, centered around the late-1920s, both architects and critical theorists were grappling with the conceptual problems of modernity, yet each group remained largely unaware of the efforts of the other. Through careful readings of both the architectural projects and the critical texts, Hilde Heynen now weaves together the concepts and categories, as well as searing critiques and radical recommendations, that emerged from that situation. Architecture's deep engagement with the construction and the critique of modernity—its liberating potential as well as crushing limitations—was never more vividly narrated.
