= Mario Carpo =

Italian architectural historian (born 1958)

Mario Carpo (born 1958)is an Italian architectural historian and critic, and is currently the inaugural Reyner Banham Professor of Architectural History and Theory at the Bartlett School of Architecture, University College London, and Professor of Architectural Theory at the Institute of Architecture of the University of Applied Arts Vienna.
