= Manushyalaya Chandrika =

Sixteenth century CE treatise

The cover page of Manushyalaya Chandrika published by Chowkhamba Krishnadas Academy, Varanasi.

Manushyalaya Chandrika is a sixteenth century CE treatise in Sanskrit dealing with domestic architecture. The work is authored by Thirumangalath Neelakanthan Musath and is a summarization of the basic principles of domestic architecture then widely followed in that region of India now known as Kerala State. The popularity of the text as a basic reference of traditional Kerala architecture has continued even to modern times. From the references to the deities in temples at Triprangode, Trikkandiyur, Alathiyur, etc. in the opening invocation of the treatise it can be safely surmised that the author of the work should have been a native of some place close to these temples. Nothing much is known about the life of the author other than that he has also authored a work on elephantology titled Mathangaleela.

Two versions of the work are in circulation. In one version published by Kochi Bhashaparishkarana Committee in 1928, the book contains 170 slokas and is not divided into chapters. In the version given as an appendix to a thesis submitted to Mahatma Gandhi University in 1998, the work is presented as divided into seven chapters and has a total of 246 slokas. In the introduction to the first version the commentator has alluded to such a version as has been published with a commentary by Paloli Choi Vaidyar in the Malyayalam year 1080.

== Outline of the contents ==
The topics discussed in the text include the following:

- Matters to be considered while selecting a plot where the house is to be constructed
- Methods for the determination of the cardinal directions
- Different units of measurements
- Rules for computations of the dimensions of the house to be constructed
- Descriptions of different types of houses (chathussalas)
- Practical instructions for making rafters and other materials

== Translations ==
1. K. Paramesvara Menon (Commentator) (1928). Manushyalaya Chandrika. Thrissur: Kochi Bhasha Parishkarana Committee. (Text in Malayalam script and commentary in Malayalam language)
2. The complete text of Manushaylaya Chandrika in Devanagari script together with an English translation is available as part of a PhD thesis titled "Indian mathematics related to architecture and other areas with special reference to Kerala" submitted by P. Ramakrishnan to Cochin University of Science and Technology in 1998. The thesis can be accessed here.
3. A translation of Manushyalaya Chandrika to Malayalam by Cheruvally Narayanan Namboothiri has been published by D. C. Books in 2011.
4. A translation of Manushyalaya Chandrika to Hindi by Srikrishna Jugnu has been published by Chowkhamba Krishnadas Academy, Varanasi.
