= Mark Foster Gage =

American architect

- Born: November 22, 1973 (age 52); Omaha, Nebraska
- Education: University of Notre Dame (1997), Yale University (2001)
- Occupation: Architect
- Partner: Jarron Magallanes
- Practice: Mark Foster Gage Architects
- Buildings: Penkridge Hall, Shropshire England
- Projects: Tower on West 57th Street, New York City
- Design: Outfit for Lady Gaga
- Website: mfga.com

Mark Foster Gage (born November 22, 1973) is an American designer, theorist, writer and founder of Mark Foster Gage Architects in New York City. He is a tenured Associate Professor and former Assistant Dean at the Yale University School of Architecture where he has been on the faculty since 2001. His academic expertise at Yale is in the field of aesthetic philosophy. He has also been a design contributor for CNN. In 2022 he created the Mark Foster Gage Foundation, a private charitable organization that funds efforts to improve the built environment through supporting innovative architectural research, education, publications, and projects.

== Background and education ==
Gage holds a B.Arch. with a second major in Art History from the University of Notre Dame and a M.Arch. from Yale University. Gage spent his years as a student surrounded by some of the most notable architects of the twentieth-first century. He was a protegee of Robert A. M. Stern and studio assistant to Frank Gehry.

== Career ==
After completing his graduate studies at Yale University in 2001, Mark Foster Gage joined the university's faculty where he currently holds positions as a tenured Associate Professor of Architecture and an Assistant Dean in the Yale School of Architecture. There he teaches graduate-level design courses and seminars on subjects including aesthetics, innovation and the process and implications of architectural decay.

In 2002 Mark Foster Gage founded Gage / Clemenceau Architects with his former Notre Dame roommate, Marc Clemenceau Bailly. In 2012 he reorganized the firm as Mark Foster Gage Architects - a practice dedicated to creating buildings that blend new technologies with novel design practices which place emphasis on aesthetics. Gage was described as "the Most Prolific Architect of Buildings That Don't Exist" in the title for a Surface Magazine article on his work and career, a light-hearted jab the architect takes no offense to. Gage often speaks to the fact that the vast majority of his and his firm's designs go unconstructed, treating the unbuilt as proof that the twenty-first century field of architecture must reexamine its core values. In a 2012 press interview with Designers & Books, conducted to promote his then recently published book Aesthetic Theory: Essential Texts for Architecture and Design, Gage refers to himself as being "old-fashioned" due to his beliefs on the relationship between architectural form and symbolic meaning. Gage makes a thinly veiled critique of ‘starchitect’ Santiago Calatrava's World Trade Center Transportation Hub in New York City when asserting in the same interview that "some of our most celebrated architectural projects are celebrated for reasons that have nothing to do with the building itself—rather, they represent a bird or some other conceptual idea. My book is aimed at challenging the dominant practice of only justifying our work conceptually, in abstract terms."

Gage has been referred to by "The Spectator" magazine (London), as "the most decoratively radical architect at work today." His most recognized projects include his 2015 proposal for 41 West 57th Street, a 102-story skyscraper that a developer requested, which drew wide attention; however, the developer never built the structure. His firms diverse output also include an outfit for Lady Gaga, logo designs for the Biden/Harris Presidential Campaign (2020), and the Elanan Capella and Treyam Equinox resorts in the Middle East.

Gage actualizes his thoughts about the need to challenge abstraction as the pinnacle of good design through a practice he refers to as kitbashing. Kitbashing typically refers to model train enthusiasts who combine parts from multiple model train kits to create their own unique train; Gage, however, employs the term to refer to the process of combining basic and unrelated figures into cohesive adornments for his buildings. Gage's designs are created by compiling 2D and 3D images which he and his team find through simple Google searches which he thinks of as a kind of recycling process: giving the images the team kind's new life in his designs.

Gage proposed and designed the original Times Square Valentine's Day heart in 2009; a design competition for the Times Square heart has since become an annual event.

Gage's work has been exhibited in numerous museums internationally including the MoMA, The Museum of the Art Institute of Chicago, The High Museum of Art in Atlanta, The National Gallery of Art in Japan, Hiroshima City Museum of Contemporary Art, Frac Centre-Val de Loire in France, The Franz Mayer Museum in Mexico City, and Venice Biennale, Beijing Biennale, and Prague Biennale. His work has been featured in most major architectural publications as well as Vogue, Newsweek, Fast Company, Wired, USA Today, The New York Times, New York Magazine, Harper's Bazaar, Surface, and a recent twenty-five page feature in A+U. Television coverage of his work has aired on PBS, Fox, and MTV, and he was recently the subject of a documentary segment on the Travel Channel China's program 'Go as Far as You Can' which focuses on international innovators in creative fields.

Gage also writes about architecture and design in both academic and popular formats- including books, magazines, and journal articles.

== Projects and proposals ==
=== Proposal for 41 West 57th St, New York City, New York (2015) ===
Also referred to as the Khaleesi Tower, 41 West 57th St is the most famous of Gage's designs. If completed the tower would stand at an imposing 1,492 feet tall, housing ninety-one residential units across 102 stories. Retail stores, a two-story ballroom, and a restaurant would inhabit a sky lounge located on the sixty-fourth floor. Visitors would not be confined to the indoors, however, as four cantilevered balconies would allow individuals to emerge from the sixty-fourth floor lounge and overlook Central Park.

The location of the proposal is especially interesting with regard to its exterior due to the development of the surrounding area. The Khaleesi Tower, if constructed, would be one of many luxury residential towers built in Midtown Manhattan, referred to as Billionaire's Row. While the press described the Khaleesi Tower as a "sumptuous crust of carved and gilded forms," an "acid fever dream," and "what might happen if Michelangelo was brought back to life and commissioned to design a skyscraper," the surrounding towers, like Rafael Vinoly's 432 Park Avenue and Roger Duffy's 252 East 57th Street have been skewered for their simple designs. Gage himself explained that his design for the Khaleesi Tower was an attempt "to try to find a cure for the bland and featureless modern glass-box structures that you find in nearly all cities worldwide."

Gage's proposal was ultimately not selected, with the developer Sedesco instead choosing a simpler, 1,100ft, 63-story, mixed-use supertall designed by the Office for Metropolitan Architecture.

=== Nicola Formichetti Store, New York City, New York (2011) ===
Foster Gage has designed a series of retail stores for fashion designer Nicola Formichetti in New York City, Hong Kong, and Beijing, which showcased selected outfits from Lady Gaga. This series of projects led to his later collaboration with Formichetti on both an outfit for Lady Gaga and a line of cosmetic products for MAC Cosmetics which were sold internationally.

The Nicola Formichetti Store, a pop-up shop constructed for the 2011 New York Fashion Week, utilizes "hundreds of robotically carved mirrored facets" to create a space to display many of the fashion pieces Nicola Formichetti designed for singer Lady Gaga.

== Books ==
- On the Appearance of the World: A Future for Aesthetics in Architecture. University of Minnesota Press, 2024.
- Speaking of Architecture. Interviews about Practice, Discourse, and What Comes Next. Oro Press, 2022.
- Mark Foster Gage: Architecture in High Resolution (monograph). Oro Press, 2022.
- Mark Foster Gage: Projects and Provocations (monograph). Rizzoli Press, 2018
- Designing Social Equality: Architecture, Aesthetics, and the Perception of Democracy. Routledge, 2018 ISBN 9780815369745
- Aesthetics Equals Politics: New Discourses Across Art, Architecture and Philosophy. MIT Press, 2019 ISBN 9780262039437
- Aesthetic Theory: Essential Texts for Architecture and Design. W. W. Norton & Company, 2011
- Composites, Surfaces and Software: High Performance Architecture, with Greg Lynn. Yale School of Architecture, 2010 ISBN 9780393733334
