= Elke Krasny =

Austrian cultural theorist and writer (born 1965)

- Born: 1965 (age 60–61); Vienna, Austria
- Education: University of Reading
- Known for: Curating, Writing, Research
- Awards: Austria Children and Youth Literature Award, 2006 Awarded by the Arts and Culture Division of the Federal Chancellery of Austria Outstanding Artist Award – Women’s Culture 2011 Awarded by the Arts and Culture Division of the Federal Chancellery of Austria Visiting Curator at the Hongkong Community Museum Project 2011 Audain Visual Artist in Residence 2011 AVAIR Program, Audain Gallery, Simon Fraser University, Vancouver, BC, Canada Gabriele Possanner State Prize, 2023, Awarded by the Federal Ministry of Science and Research of Austria
- Website: http://elkekrasny.at/

Elke Krasny (born 1965 in Vienna, Austria) is a cultural and architectural theorist, urban researcher, curator, and author. Her work specializes in architecture, contemporary art, urbanism, feminist museology, histories and theories of curating, critical historiographies of feminism, politics of remembrance, and their intersections. Krasny received her Ph.D. from the University of Reading. She is Professor of Art and Education at the Academy of Fine Arts Vienna. She worked as a visiting professor at the University of Bremen and the Academy of Fine Arts Nuremberg. In 2012 she was visiting scholar at the Canadian Centre for Architecture CCA, Montréal. In 2014, she was City of Vienna Visiting Professor at the Interdisciplinary Centre for Urban Culture and Public Space (SKuOR) at the Vienna University of Technology. Using the framework of political care ethic developed by Joan Tronto, Krasny works on developing a perspective of critical care for architectural and urban practice and theory. In 2019, together with Angelika Fitz she edited Critical Care. Architecture and Urbanism for a Broken Planet.

== Curating ==
Krasny's research-based curatorial work The Force is in the Mind. The Making of Architecture was shown at the Architecture Centre Vienna in 2008. Her field research on Canadian architectural practices was presented in the exhibition Penser tout haut. Faire l’Architecture at the Centre de Design of UQAM in Montréal in 2010 and subsequently The Making of Architecture was shown at the Dalhousie University School of Architecture in Halifax in 2011. In 2011-2012 she was Visiting Artist at the Audain Gallery Vancouver and together with the Downtown Eastside Women's Center DEWC worked on the process-oriented exhibition Mapping the Everyday. Neighbourhood Claims for the Future. Krasny curated the research-based exhibition Hands-On Urbanism in 2012 which originated at the Architecture Centre Vienna and was shown internationally, including venues like the Museum for Contemporary Art Leipzig the 2012 Venice Biennale, the Architecture Gallery Dessa in Ljubljana, the Moravian Gallery in Brno, the Urban Space Gallery Toronto, by d.talks in Calgary, and at the Kibel Gallery, School of Architecture, Planning & Preservation University of Maryland.

Krasny's exhibition Suzanne Lacy’s International Dinner Party in Feminist Curatorial Thought was shown at ZHdK Zurich University of the Arts in Switzerland in 2015 and subsequently at the 13th International Architecture Humanities Research Association Conference, Architecture, Ecologies, Economies, Technologies & Feminisms at KTH Royal Institute of Technology Stockholm, Sweden in 2016 Krasny together with Angelika Fitz curated the research project and exhibition Care+Repair in the context of the 2017 Vienna Biennale.

== Lectures and symposia ==
In 2010, Elke Krasny organized the international symposium Women: Museum. From Collection Strategy to Social Platform at the Vienna Library at City Hall.

Krasny initiated and curated the 2012 international conference Women’s Movements: Feminist Agency. Intersections of Activism, Archiving, Art, Art History, Critical Research, Curating, Education, Feminisms and Politics of Remembrance at rotor association for contemporary art in Graz.

She gave a lecture at the 2014 Conference Cooperative Cities in the frame of the Urban Colloquium Lecture Series at the Parsons School of Design in NYC.

In 2015, she initiated and co-curated the symposium Counter/Acting Self-Organized Universities, held jointly at the Academy of Fine Arts Vienna and the Kunsthalle Wien.

The lecture on Hands-On Urbanism at Medialab-Prado Madrid was part of the 2015 public seminar Affective Urbanism organized by the Interdisciplinary Centre for Urban Culture and Public Space (Vienna University of Technology), VIC Vivero de Iniciativas Ciudadanas and Intermediae-Matadero.

The symposium Curating in Feminist Thought, organized together with Lara Perry and Dorothee Richter, was held at Migros Museum Zurich in 2016.

In 2017, Krasny together with Lara Perry, Dorothee Richter, and Barbara Mahlknecht organized the symposium Unsettling Feminist Curating at the Academy of Fine Arts Vienna.

In 2021 Krasny delivered the lecture Realities of Care: On Interdependence in Architecture as part of the Sciame Lecture Series Architectures of Care organized by the Bernard and Anne Spitzer School of Architecture at The City College of New York. She also gave a keynote lecture on Architecture for Future. Caring for a Broken Planet on the occasion of the Opening Architecture Festival at the Aarhus School of Architecture.

== Bibliography ==
The following is a selection of works written or edited by Elke Krasny.

- Angela Heide and Elke Krasny (eds.): Aufbruch in die Nähe. Wien Lerchenfelderstraße / Other Places. Vienna Lerchenfelderstreet.) Other Places. Vienna Lerchenfelder Street. Micro-histories between local identities and globalization. Vienna: Turia + Kant 2010
- Elke Krasny and Architecture Centre Vienna (eds.): The Force is in the Mind. The Making of Architecture. Basel: Birkhäuser 2008
- Elke Krasny and Architecture Centre Vienna (eds.) Hands-On Urbanism. The Right to Green 1850-2012, Hong Kong: MCCM 2012
- How to Share Space? Inside/Outside/Along/Within/Together, in: Angela Pilch Ortega and Barbara Schröttner (eds.): Transnational Spaces and Regional Localization. Social Networks, Border Regions and Local-Global Relations, Münster, New York, Munich, Berlin: Waxmann 2012, p. 81-92
- Elke Krasny and Women's Museum Meran (eds.): Women's:Museum/ Frauen:Museum. Curatorial Politics in feminism, education, history and art, Vienna: Löcker published in 2013.
- ‘The Domestic is Political: The Feminisation of Domestic Labour and Its Critique in Feminist Art Practice.’ In Anna Maria Guasch Ferrer and Nasheli Jiménez del Val (eds.) Critical Cartography of Art and Visuality in the Global Age, edited by Newcastle upon Tyne: Cambridge Scholars Publishing, 2014, p. 161-178.
- ‘Growing the Seeds of Change’ in Jordan Geiger (ed.): Entr'Acte: Performing Publics, Pervasive Media, and Architecture, New York: Palgrave Macmillan 2015, p. 137-154
- Regina Bittner and Elke Krasny (eds.) In Reserve: The Household! Historic Models and Contemporary Positions form the Bauhaus, Leipzig: Spector Books 2016
- ‘Putting on the Map. Suzanne Lacy’s International Dinner Party’ in Martino Stierli and Mechtild Widrich (eds): Participation in Art and Architecture, Participation in Art and Architecture – Spaces of Interaction and Occupation, London: I.B. Tauris, 2016
- ‘Curatorial Materialism. A Feminist Perspective on Independent and Co-Dependent Curating’ in OnCurating, issue 29, 2016, p. 96-107
- ‘Neighbourhood Claims for the Future: feminist solidarity urbanism in Vancouver's Downtown Eastside’ in Doina Petrescu and Kim Trogal (eds.) The Social (Re)Production of Architecture. Politics, Values and Actions in Contemporary Practice. London: Routledge 2017, p. 93-112
- Suzanne Lacy's International Dinner Party in Feminist Curatorial Thought: A Curator's Talk’ in Meike Schalk and Karin Reisinger (eds.) “Styles of Queer Feminist Practices and Objects” Architecture and Culture, Volume 5, 2017, p. 435-453
- The Salon Model: The Conversational Complex’ in Victoria Horne and Lara Perry (eds.) Feminism and Art History Now. Radical Critiques of Theory and Practice, London: I.B. Tauris 2017, p. 134-142
- Exposed: The Politics of Infrastructure in VALIE EXPORT's Transparent Space.’ in Angela Dimitrakaki and Kirsten Lloyd (eds.): Social Reproduction and Art, Third Text, volume 31, 2017, p. 133-146
- ‘Resilient subjects: On building imaginary communities.‘ co-authored with Meike Schalk, in eike Schalk, Thérèse Kristiansson, and Ramia Mazé (eds.): Feminist Futures of Spatial Practice. Materialisms, Activisms, Dialogues, Pedagogies, Projections, Baunach: AADR, p. 139-148
- For Us, Art is Work’: In♀Akt – International Action Community of Women Artists, in Agata Jakubowski and Katy Deepwell, eds: All-women art spaces in Europe in the long 1970s, Liverpool: Liverpool University Press 2017, p. 96-118
- ‘Citizenship and the Museum: On Feminist Acts’ In Jenna Ashton (ed.): Feminism and Museums: Intervention, Disruption, and Change. Volume 1, Edinburgh and Boston: MuseumsEtc 2017
- ‘Modernist Green. Changing Regimes of Labour.’ In Andreas Rumpfhuber (ed.): Into the Great Wide Open, Barcelona: dpr. 2017
- Angelika Fitz and Elke Krasny (eds.): Critical Care. Architecture and Urbanism for a Broken Planet, 2019
- Staying with the Crisis: A Feminist Politics of Care for Living with an Infected Planet, Escritura y Imagen, 2020, ISSN: 1885-5687
- On Care and Citizenship, In: New Infrastructures. Performative Infrastructures in the Art Field, Passepartout 22; 40, 2020
