= Konrad Fiedler =

Art historian

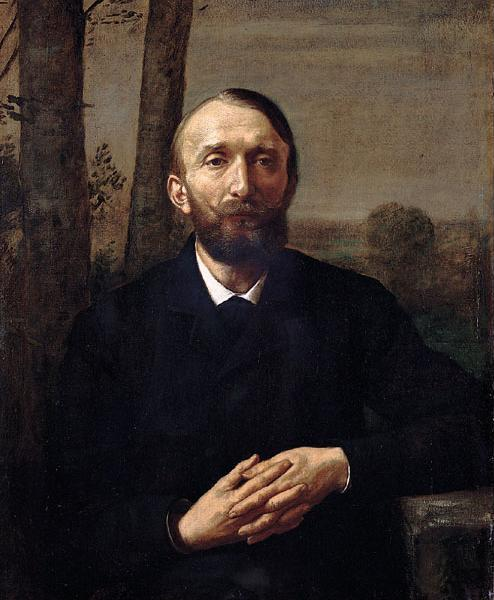
- Portrait of Konrad Fiedler by Hans Thoma
- Born: Adolph Konrad Fiedler; 23 September 1841; Oederan, Kingdom of Saxony
- Died: 13 June 1895 (aged 53); Munich, Kingdom of Bavaria
- Occupations: art historian, art collector and writer
- Spouse: Mary Meyer

Adolph Konrad Fiedler or Conrad Fiedler (23 September 1841 – 13 June 1895) was a German art historian, art collector and writer. Fiedler was one of the most important German art theorist of the 19th century.

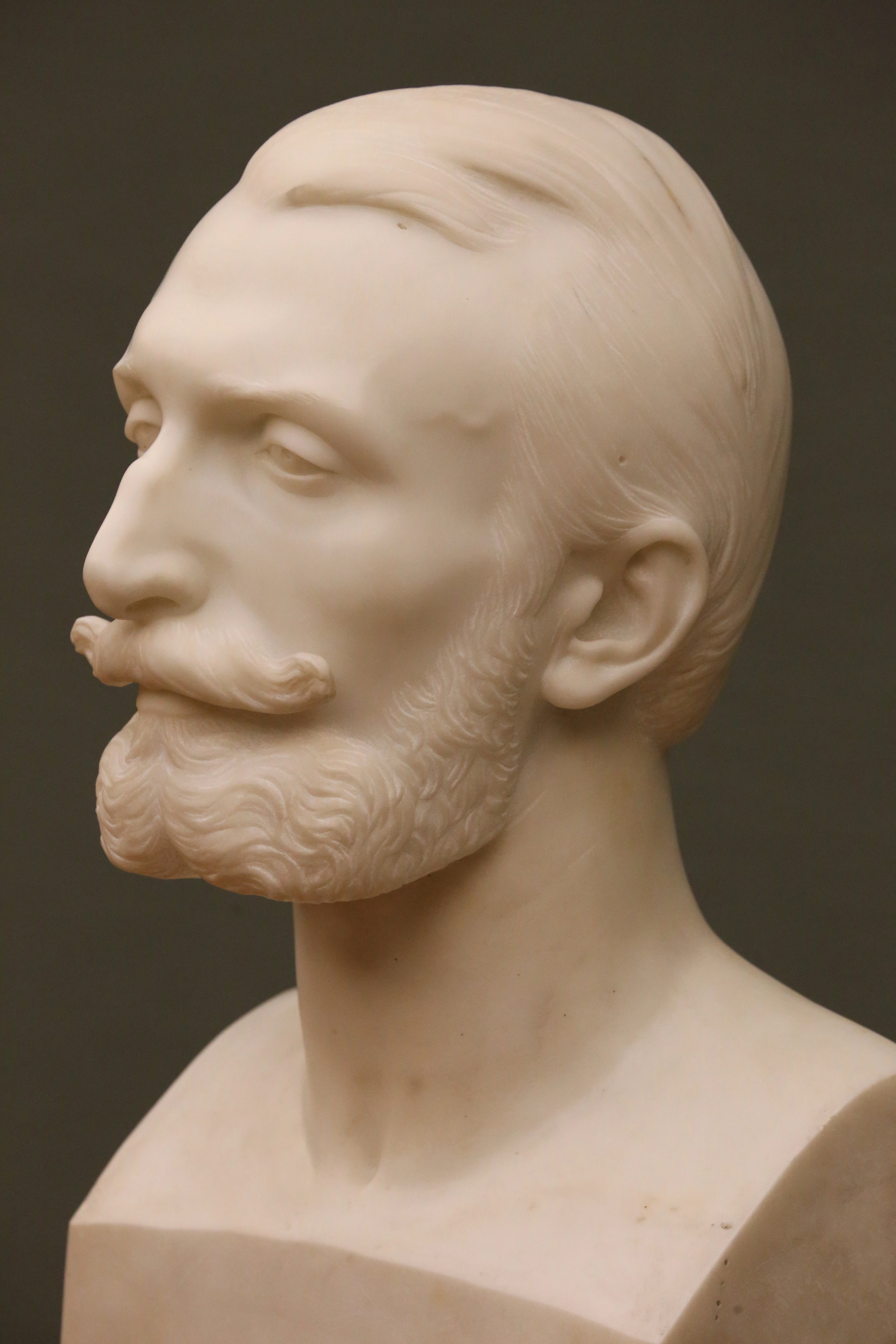
Bust of Konrad Fiedler by Adolf von Hildebrand

Fiedler was born in Oederan. He studied law at the Heidelberg University and the University of Lausanne. In 1876 Fiedler married Mary Meyer. In 1895 Konrad Fiedler died in Munich by the fall from a balcony. He was buried in the family tomb on the estate Crostewitz.
