= Tilmann Buddensieg =

German art historian

Tilmann Buddensieg (21 June 1928 – 2 September 2013) was a German art historian.

== Early life ==
Tilmann Buddensieg was born in Berlin on 21 June 1928. He studied art history, classical and early Christian archeology and Byzantine studies. He promoted in 1956 at the University of Cologne with a work on The Basle Antependium in Paris. After his doctorate, he was a volunteer at the Museum für Kunst und Gewerbe in Hamburg until 1957.

== Career ==
From 1962 to 1965 he was an assistant at the Kunsthistorisches Institut of the Freie Universität Berlin. In 1965 he qualified as a professor at the Free University of Berlin with a work on The Afterlife of Ancient Architecture and Sculpture in Rome. From 1968 he was full professor for art history at the Freie Universität Berlin. In 1978, he was appointed to a professorship at the University of Bonn, where he emerged in 1993. From 1995 he was honorary professor at the Humboldt-Universität zu Berlin. He contended that reconstruction produces only simplistic replicas and falsifications for tourists who won't look closely (Schreiber 183).

== Personal life ==
Buddensieg lived in Berlin and Munich. His son was the photographer Tobias Buddensieg (1955–2010).

== Death and legacy ==
He died on 2 September 2013. Important Nietzsche documents from the estate of Buddensieg were given to the Nietzsche Documentation Center (Nietzsche Society) in Naumburg.

== Academic degrees ==
- Elève titulaire of the École des Hautes Études Paris 1955
- Diploma of the École du Louvre Paris 1955
- Dr. phil. Cologne 1956
- Habilitation in 1965, Freie Universität Berlin
- MA hon. Cambridge Kings College 1974
- Honorary Professor Humboldt University Berlin 1995

== Scholarships and fellowships ==
- Junior Fellow, Society of Fellows, Harvard University, 1957-1960,
- Fellowship of the German Research Foundation, Italy 1960-1962 and 1969
- Visiting Scholar at the Warburg Institute in London
- Fellow at Kings College, Cambridge, 1974
- Fellow Wissenschaftskolleg zu Berlin 1985/86
- Visiting Scholar, Getty Center for the History of Arts and Humanities, Santa Monica, USA 1988-1989

== Selected memberships ==
- Comité International d'Histoire de l 'Art, Section Allemande
- Board of the Bibliotheca Hertziana, Rome 1968-1972
- Association of German Art History, chairman 1968-1972
- Chairman of the Artistic Advisory Board of KPM - Königliche Porzellan-Manufaktur Berlin GmbH, 1991-1999
- Expert in the Advisory Board of the Senate for Urban Development and Environmental Protection Berlin,
- 1992-1999 Member of the Advisory Board of the Foundation Einstein Forum Potsdam, since 1992

== Selected publications ==
- Industriekultur. Peter Behrens und die AEG, Gebr. Mann Verlag, Berlin 1979, 4. Aufl. 1994. Engl. Ausgabe MIT Press, Cambridge/Mass, 1984
- Die nützlichen Künste, Quadriga Verlag, Berlin, 1981
- Villa Hügel. Das Wohnhaus Krupp in Essen, Siedler Verlag, Berlin 1984
- Keramik in der Weimarer Republik 1919–1933, Electa, Mailand 1984 und Germanisches Nationalmuseum Nürnberg, 1985
- Wissenschaften in Berlin, 3 Bände. Gebr. Mann Verlag, Berlin 1987
- "Nietzsches Italien. Stadte, Garten und Palaste" Klaus Wagenbach, Berlin 2002 (it.transl. ""L'Italia di Nietzsche" - transl. by Novati, Laura)Libri Scheiwiller, Milano, 2006.
