= Fritz Neumeyer =

German architectural theoretician (born 1946)

Fritz Neumeyer (born 1946 in Germany) is an architectural theoretician and a professor emeritus.

Neumeyer held the chair and professorship for Theory of Architecture at the Technische Universität Berlin from 1993 until 2012. Before, Neumeyer taught as the Jean Labatut Professor of Architecture at Princeton University in 1992 and Professor for the History of Architecture at TU Dortmund from 1992 to 1989. He was a visiting professor at Harvard University, KU Leuven, SCIARC Santa Monica, Institut d’ Humanitats de Barcelona and Universidad de Navarra. In 1988/89 he was a research fellow at the Getty Center for the History of Art and the Humanities.

Neumeyer is considered the foremost scholar on the modernist architect Ludwig Mies van der Rohe. Neumeyer's most famous book is titled The Artless Word: Mies van der Rohe on the Building Art, originally published in German in 1986 ("Mies van der Rohe. Das kunstlose Wort. Gedanken zur Baukunst"). Other publications include Friedrich Gilly 1772–1800. Essays on Architecture (1994), Der Klang der Steine. Nietzsches Architekturen (2001), Quellentexte zur Architekturtheorie (2002), Outside The Bauhaus. Mies van der Rohe and Berlin 1933 (2020, "Ausgebootet: Mies van der Rohe und das Bauhaus 1933").
