= Oppositions =

- Discipline: Architecture
- Language: English

Standard abbreviations
- ISO 4: Oppositions

Oppositions was an architectural journal produced by the Institute for Architecture and Urban Studies from 1973 to 1984. Many of its articles contributed to advancing architectural theory and many of its contributors became distinguished practitioners in the field of architecture. Twenty-six issues were produced during its eleven years of existence.

Oppositions was edited by Peter Eisenmann (1-25), Kenneth Frampton (1-25), Mario Gandelsonas (1-26), Anthony Vidler (6-26), Kurt W. Forster (12-25), and Diana Agrest (26). Contributors included: Diana Agrest, Stanford Anderson, Giorgio Ciucci, Stuart Cohen, Alan Colquhoun, Francesco Dal Co, Peter Eisenman, William Ellis, Kurt W. Forster, Kenneth Frampton, Mario Gandelsonas, Giorgio Grassi, Fred Koetter, Rem Koolhaas, Léon Krier, Mary McLeod, Rafael Moneo, Joan Ockman, Martin Pawley, Aldo Rossi, Colin Rowe, Denise Scott Brown, Jorge Silvetti, Ignasi de Solà-Morales, Manfredo Tafuri, Bernard Tschumi, Anthony Vidler, and Hajime Yatsuka.

The journal was designed by Massimo Vignelli. It collaborated with Arquitecturas Bis, a Barcelona-based architecture magazine. The same writers published articles in both titles which frequently cited each other.
