= David Mohney =

American architect

David Mohney FAIA is an American architect, urbanist, writer, and dean at Kean University and Wenzhou-Kean University.

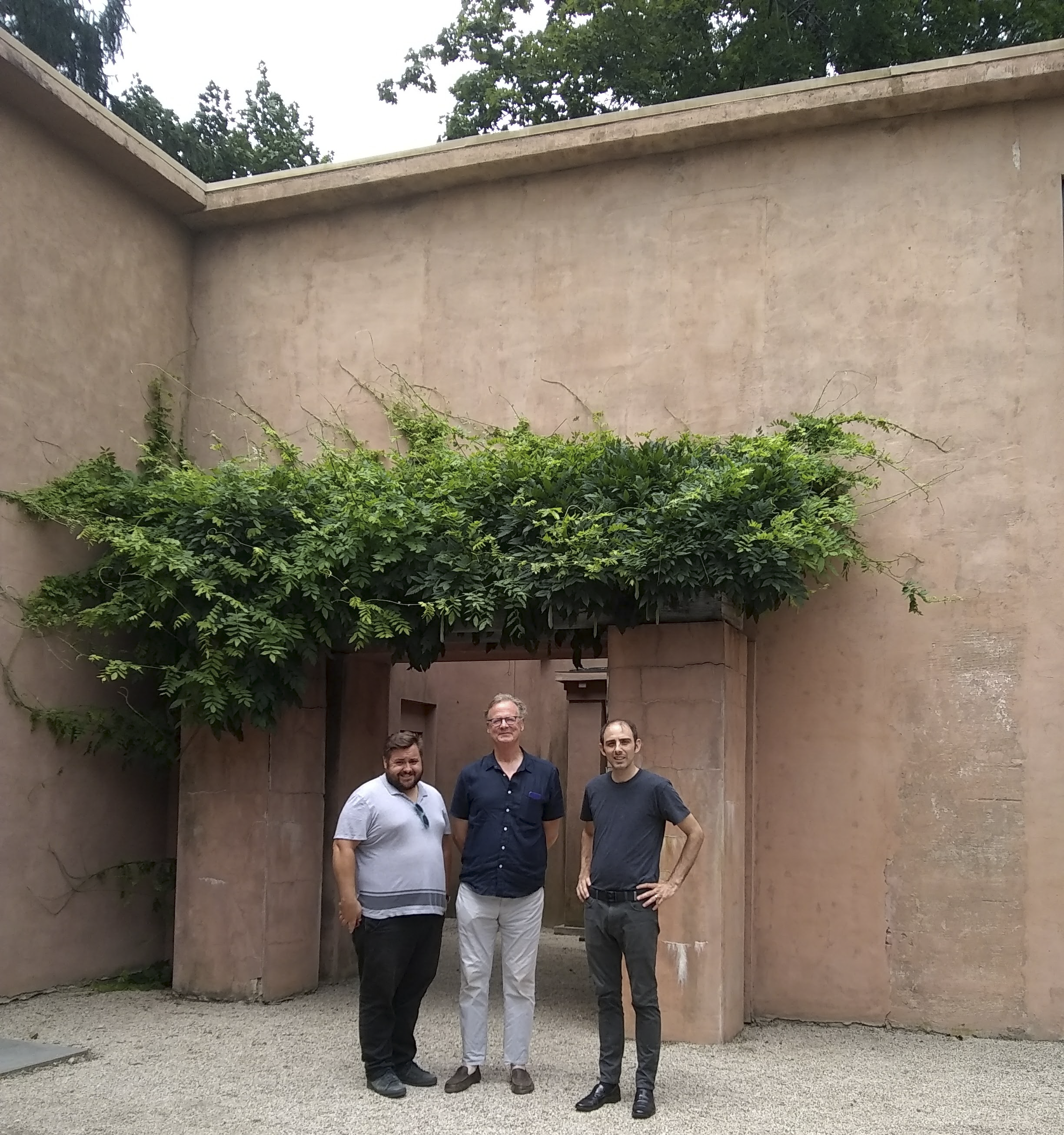
Mohney standing in front of the home and studio of Michael Graves, "The Warehouse," in Princeton, New Jersey; with Vincent Peu Duvallon and Ralph Spencer Steenblik.

== Biography ==
He is a fellow of the American Institute of Architects, holds a M.Arch from Princeton University School of Architecture and attended Harvard University to study Fine Arts, where he received his A.B.. He is the dean at Kean University and Wenzhou-Kean University for The Michael Graves College and previously the dean for University of Kentucky College of Design. He has taught at the Institute for Architecture and Urban Studies in New York City, the Graduate School of Design at Harvard, and the Southern California Institute of Architecture in Los Angeles.

He has contributed to the architectural discourse throughout his career through his authorship and continued dialog with notable personalities within the architectural discourse such as: Paul Goldberger, contributing editor at Vanity Fair, educators Peter Eisenman, Monica Ponce de Leon, and Anthony Vidler. He had a role in the establishment of The Michael Graves College, has been a juror for the American Institute of Architecture Gold Medal and secretary for the Curry Stone Design Prize.

== Publications ==
- The Houses of Philip Johnson. 2004. By Stover Jenkins, Mohney. Photographer Steven Brooke. Afterword by Neil Levine. ISBN 978-0-78920-838-5.
- Seaside: Making a Town in America. New York: Princeton Architectural, 1991. By Mohney and Keller Easterling. ISBN 978-0-910413268.
