= Princeton University School of Architecture =

Architecture school of Princeton University

Coordinates: 40.347897°N 74.656171°W

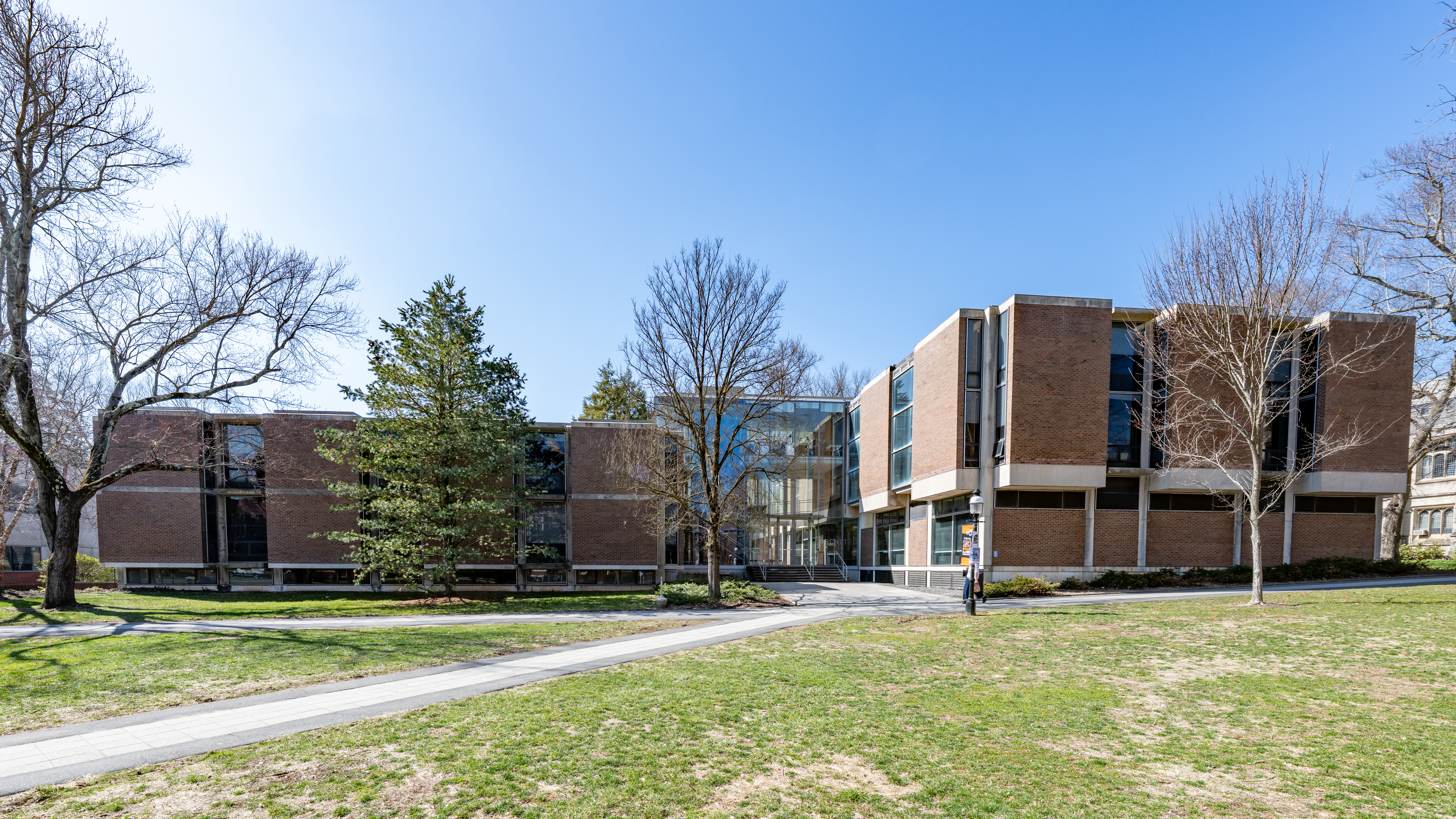
- (2026)
- Type: Private
- Established: 1919
- Parent institution: Princeton University
- Dean: Mónica Ponce de León
- Students: Approximately 180 undergraduate and graduate students
- Location: Princeton, New Jersey, U.S.
- Website: soa.princeton.edu

The Princeton University School of Architecture is the architecture school of Princeton University. Founded in 1919, the School is a center for teaching and research in architectural design, history, and theory. The School offers an undergraduate concentration (equivalent of major) and advanced degrees at the master's and doctoral levels.

== History ==
In 1832, Joseph Henry, who later became the first secretary of the Smithsonian Institution, taught the first course in architecture at Princeton University. The course focused on the classification of architectural styles and designs. Additional courses and programs for architecture began in 1882 when Princeton University's Department of Art and Archaeology began courses on architecture and historical drawing in 1902. By 1915, the first academic committee convened to consider the establishment of a school of architecture. Arrangements for a new program were planned for 1917, but were delayed until 1919 when the School of Architecture formally opened.

During its formative years, the School of Architecture's pedagogy was guided by architectural educators such as Howard Crosby Butler, E. Raymond Bossange, Frederick D'Amato, Sherley Warner Morgan, and Jean Labatut, who is credited with developing it into one of the top schools of architecture in the country. Visitors and teachers often included figures such as Frank Lloyd Wright, Le Corbusier, Richard Neutra, and R. Buckminster Fuller.

In 1965, Robert Geddes was appointed the first dean of the School of Architecture. Under his direction, the School of Architecture grew in size and in prestige, while also collaborating with other departments at Princeton University. As the School of Architecture expanded, it began attracting notable architects as teachers, including Louis I. Kahn, Mario Salvadori, Michael Graves, Kenneth Frampton, Peter Eisenman, Diana Agrest, Robert Geddes, Alan Colquhoun, Michael Hays, Scott Cohen, and Anthony Vidler. During his time as Dean, the School admitted women for the first time in 1968, advanced academic research was conducted on this historic threshold by Dr. Meral Ekincioglu with MIT-Architecture Department's academic sponsorship. (https://www.youtube.com/watch?v=P-Bcie-0p8Q&t=253s).

By the end of the twentieth century, it reorganized the A.B. degree around multiple fields of study and conducted renovations of the Architecture Building. It also promoted several members to its tenure-track faculty including Beatriz Colomina, Elizabeth Diller, and Guy Nordenson.

The following individuals have served as deans of the School of Architecture:

- Robert Geddes, 1965–1982
- Robert Maxwell, 1982–1989
- Ralph Lerner, 1989–2002
- Stan Allen, 2002–2012
- Alejandro Zaera-Polo, 2012–2014
- Mario Gandelsonas, 2015
- Mónica Ponce de León, 2016–2025
- Sylvia Lavin, 2026

== Academics ==
=== Undergraduate ===
The School of Architecture offers a rigorous, interdisciplinary curriculum in the study of architecture. The degree conferred to students is an A.B. degree. Undergraduate students study a range of disciplines including architectural design, history of architecture, architectural analysis, computing, and others. Students may also enroll in the Program in Urban Studies which focuses on the study of cities, metropolitan regions, and urban and suburban landscapes. The degree requirements also include junior independent work, which involves a written exam supervised by a faculty adviser, and a senior thesis, demonstrating a research paper based on visual materials.

=== Graduate ===
The School of Architecture offers two graduate degrees: a professional degree (M.Arch.) and an academic degree (Ph.D.). The professional master's degree takes three years to complete and does not require an architecture background while the post-professional two-year program requires a Bachelor of Architecture (B.Arch.) degree. The rigorous program requires students to take 25 courses from a list of prerequisites and electives.

The Ph.D. program has two tracks: (1) history and theory and (2) technology. The history and theory track is an interdisciplinary program that focuses on the relationship between architecture and related fields, such as urbanism, landscape, and building technology. The degree requires students to take two years of coursework and independent study, after which they begin their dissertation. Students must pass two foreign language exams, which generally include French, German, Spanish, or Italian. In 2014, the School launched the new architectural technology Ph.D. track for computation and energy. The track focuses on new techniques in computation and energy/environmental performance. The program is supported by Princeton's School of Engineering and Applied Science. While the first two years of coursework are similar to the Ph.D. in History and Theory, the Ph.D. in Technology requires students to concentrate in a particular subfield of technology.

== Facilities and Research ==
=== School of Architecture Building ===
The School of Architecture building was dedicated in 1963. In 2007, New York City architecture firm ARO designed the first significant addition to the building since it was first constructed.

=== Embodied Computation Lab ===
The Embodied Computation Lab, located off the School of Architecture grounds proper, is a teaching and research facility dedicated to the interface between computation and design and the development of knowledge in the fields of digital fabrication and remote sensing. It combines architectural and engineering experimentation to utilize computation design, digital fabrication, and sophisticated sensing, actuation, and control electronics that make the Lab a center for interdisciplinary design exploration and prototyping.

Over 5,000 square feet of space is available for heavier fabrication work, hands-on material experiments, and the construction of full-scale mock-ups. Also housed within the Lab are facilities for building in wood, plastic, metal, and concrete that enable students to learn general model theory, build and test models of actual buildings, and study current building systems and technology.

The Lab serves a project space for developing and testing large-scale architecture and engineering prototypes inside and outside or as facade elements. Additionally, it serves as a state of the art research environment with digital fabrication equipment for full-scale material prototyping, such as a water jet cutter, large-scale metal laser cutters, multi-use robotic arm platforms for milling, additive fabrication and human machine collaboration for research in construction, and an electronics workbench for the development of sensing and control and physical computing applications.

In 2017, the Lab won the 2017 Best of Design Awards for Green - Civic from The Architect's Newspaper.

=== VSL Woodshop ===
The VSL Woodshop, located in the basement of the Architecture Building, is a small but well-equipped 24-hour accessible shop maintained and monitored by the School of Architecture Shop Monitor program.

=== School of Architecture Library ===
The School of Architecture Library opened in 1964 as the Library for Urban and Environmental Studies, with the Bureau of Urban Research constituting its charter collection. Today, the library, still familiarly referred to as UES, is one of ten libraries within the Princeton University Library system. The collection's strengths include modern and contemporary architecture and urban design, architectural history, theory, and practice. Additionally, the Library supports green design, sustainable architecture, social factors in design, architecture and the visual arts, architecture in developing countries, landscape architecture and building technology. Together, with the resources housed throughout the Princeton University Libraries, the School of Architecture Library provides access to a comprehensive collection supporting the fields of architecture, architectural research and theory, urban planning and design.

== Notable faculty ==
The following list contains both current and former faculty:

- Diana Agrest
- Stan Allen
- Beatriz Colomina
- Manuel DeLanda
- Elizabeth Diller
- Peter Eisenman
- Kenneth Frampton
- Mario Gandelsonas
- Robert Geddes
- Michael Graves
- Andres Jaque
- Louis I. Kahn
- Sylvia Lavin
- Paul Lewis
- Michael Meredith
- Guy Nordenson
- Mónica Ponce de León
- Mario Salvadori
- Alejandro Zaera-Polo

== Notable alumni ==
- Kunle Adeyemi, founder, principal, NLÉ
- Emilio Ambasz, architect and interior designer; former Curator of Design at the Museum of Modern Art (MoMA)
- Lemuel Ayers, Tony Award winning designer and producer
- Matthew Bannister, co-founder, dbox
- Joel Barkley, architect and partner, Ike Kligerman Barkley
- Keller Easterling, principal, Keller Easterling Architect; Professor, Yale School of Architecture
- Hugh Hardy, founding partner, H3 Hardy Collaboration Architecture
- Rossana Hu, founding partner, Neri and Hu, Chair of the Department of Architecture University of Pennsylvania Stuart Weitzman School of Design
- Greg Lynn, principal, Greg Lynn Form
- Jürgen Mayer, principal, J. Mayer H.
- David Mohney, dean, Kean University and Wenzhou-Kean University, The Michael Graves College
- Charles Moore, Moore, Lyndon, Turnbull & Whittaker, Dean of the Yale School of Architecture
- Hilary Sample, partner, MOS Architects, Associate Professor, Columbia GSAPP
- Robert Venturi, founder of Venturi, Scott Brown and Associates
- Sarah Whiting, dean and Josep Lluís Sert Professor of Architecture, Harvard University Graduate School of Design
- Tod Williams, Tod Williams Billie Tsien Architects
- Emily Abruzzo and Gerald Bodziak, co-founding partners of Abruzzo Bodziak Architects

== See also ==
- Architecture school in the United States
- Princeton University
- Princeton University Graduate School
- Architecture
- List of architecture schools
