= Ralph Lerner =

Ralph Lerner may refer to:

- Ralph Lerner (philosopher), American political philosopher
- Ralph Lerner (architect), American architect
