= Robin Landa =

American academic, designer, and writer

- Born: New York City, U.S.
- Occupations: Academic, designer, writer

Academic work
- Discipline: Design
- Sub-discipline: Graphic design, advertising, branding, creative thinking
- Institutions: Kean University
- Website: robinlanda.com

Robin Landa is an American academic, designer, and writer. She is a Distinguished Professor at Michael Graves College at Kean University. She received the AIGA 2025 Steven Heller Prize for Cultural Commentary. The Carnegie Foundation for the Advancement of Teaching recognized her as one of the “Great Teachers of Our Time”.

== Early life and education ==
Robin Landa was born and raised in New York City. She holds a Master of Fine Arts degree in visual art and later completed graduate-level coursework in art history.

== Career ==
After the completion of her education, Landa joined Kean University as a faculty member. She later became a Distinguished Professor in the Robert Busch School of Design at Michael Graves College.

From 2014 to 2021, Landa served as co-chair of Design Incubation, a national organization dedicated to communication design research. She serves on the Education Board of the One Club for Creativity.

== Writing ==
Landa has authored over twenty-five books about graphic design, advertising, branding, and creative thinking. Her works include Graphic Design Solutions, 6e (2019), Build Your Own Brand (2013), Advertising by Design (2010), Nimble (2015), Strategic Creativity (2022), The New Art of Ideas (2022), A Career Is a Promise (2023), Shareworthy (2024), and Branding as a Cultural Force (2026). She has contributed articles to the Harvard Business Review, Fast Company, and Inc. magazine.

She is also the co-author of Leadership by Design: Winning Hearts, Building Your Brand, and Achieving Success with Lamont O. Repollet, Ed.D.

== Awards and recognition ==
The Carnegie Foundation for the Advancement of Teaching recognized Landa as one of the "Great Teachers of Our Time." In 2013, she was named Teacher of the Year at Kean University. In 2015, she received a Human Rights Educator Award.

In 2024, she received the Gold Design Education Recognition Award. In 2025, the AIGA, the national design organization, awarded her the annual Steven Heller Prize for Cultural Commentary. Also, in 2025, she was inducted into the New Jersey Advertising Hall of Fame by the New Jersey Ad Club.
