= Holger Henke =

German political scientist (born 1960)

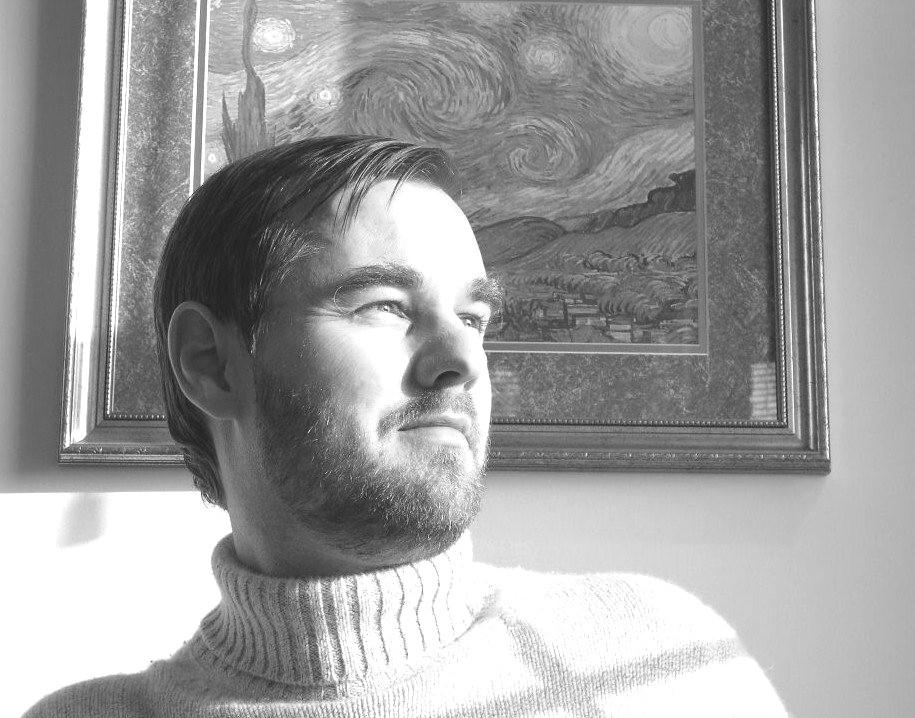
Holger Henke

Holger W. Henke (born in Viersen, North Rhine-Westphalia, Germany) is a political scientist, educator, and served as the founding director of the Bhisé Center for Global Understanding at Adelphi University (NY). In his previous position, he worked as the director of the Sir Arthur Lewis Institute for Social and Economic Studies (SALISES) at the University of the West Indies (Mona, Jamaica). Between 2014-2017 he was vice-chancellor for academic affairs and provost at Wenzhou-Kean University (associate vice president for academic affairs at Kean University) in Wenzhou, China. From 2008 to 2014 he was an assistant provost at York College, City University of New York. He has previously taught (assistant professor, 2004–2008; associate professor, 2008) at Metropolitan College of New York, and also served as associate professor of political history at Kean University. In the late 1990s he was the assistant director of the Caribbean Research Center (Medgar Evers College).

== Education ==
Holger Henke attended the Geschwister-Scholl-Institute for Political Science at LMU Munich, where he earned a Magister Artium (Political Science, with double minor in Modern German Literature and Communication Sciences) in 1987. He subsequently emigrated and lived for seven years in Jamaica. In 1996, he earned a Ph.D. in Government at the University of the West Indies (Mona, Jamaica) with a dissertation about the foreign relations of that country between 1972 and 1989.

== Research and scholarship ==
Henke studies international relations (Caribbean, Europe, US, and Asia), migration, political culture and development (political economy). He has published seven books and numerous scholarly articles. For numerous years Henke was the editor of the peer-reviewed journal Wadabagei: A Journal of the Caribbean and its Diasporas. In 2010-11 he served as President of the Caribbean Studies Association. Henke also served as an advisory board member of the Caribbean Research Center at Medgar Evers College (City University of New York), where he previously had worked as assistant director. Until 2012 he was a senior research fellow of the Council on Hemispheric Affairs in Washington (D.C.). From 2011 until 2015, he provided annual country reports for several Caribbean nations to the Washington-based think tank Freedom House; since 2018 he has provided similar reviews for the V-Dem Institute (University of Gothenburg). In 2013 Dr. Henke received a Fulbright International Education Administrators (US-UK) Award. In 2014 he participated in the Harvard University Institute for Management and Leadership in Education (MLE). In August 2010, he received the honorary citizenship of Jamaica.

== Work in Academic Administration ==
During his tenure as Vice Chancellor for Academic Affairs & Provost at Wenzhou-Kean University the student body of this institution grew from ca. 850 (AY 2014/15) to ca. 1,950 (AY 2017/18). The number of full-time faculty grew from 46 (AY 2014/15) to 96 (AY 2017/18). The establishment of several new key offices (e.g., Associate Deans for Business and Liberal Arts; Center for Curriculum Scheduling and Planning; Graphic Design studio and iMac lab; biology and physics labs; MakerSpace; Language Learning Lab; Office for Research and Sponsored Programs), the start of new academic programs (Applied Mathematics; Psychology; Graphic Design / Interactive Advertising; Management / Entrepreneurship option and Supply Chain & Information Management option; Architectural Studies), and the implementation of other academic support structures (e.g., scholarship reward program; Student Research Day; Vice Chancellor's Lecture Series; Global Lecture Series) marked the significant administrative, programmatic, and teaching & research infrastructure advancement during that period.

On September 22, 2015, China's President Xi Jinping remarked at the China-US Governors’ Forum in Seattle on the university's development: “When I was Governor of Zhejiang back in 2006, I attended a signing ceremony for a joint initiative between Wenzhou University and Kean University to establish Wenzhou-Kean University. After years of efforts, this university was finally up and running last year and is making good progress today.” The construction of new Student Residential Buildings (with 1,800 beds), the College of Business and Public Management building (opened in 2018), and the acceptance of a 100 million yuan grant by the Shanghai-based Dafa Properties Group for the construction of a School of Architecture and Design building also fall into this growth period. During this period, students had full access to the internet, were able to watch international news programs on campus, and could access the library research databases at Kean University.

== Books ==
- The End of the “Asian Model”?. (ed., with Ian Boxill), John Benjamins: Amsterdam & Philadelphia 2000.
- Between Self-Determination and Dependency: Jamaica’s Foreign Relations, 1972-1989. Kingston: University of the West Indies Press 2000.
- The West Indian Americans. Westport (CT): Greenwood Press 2001
- Modern Political Culture in the Caribbean. (ed., with Fred Reno), Kingston: University of the West Indies Press 2003.
- Crossing Over. Comparing Recent Migration in the United States and Europe, (ed.), Lanham (MD): Lexington Books 2005.
- Constructing Vernacular Culture in the Trans-Caribbean, (ed., with Karl-Heinz Magister), Lanham (MD): Lexington Books 2008.
- New Political Culture in the Caribbean. (ed., with Fred Reno), Kingston: University of the West Indies Press 2022.
