= WKU =

WKU may refer to:

- Wenzhou–Kean University, a joint-venture university in Wenzhou, Zhejiang, China
- Western Kentucky University, a public university in Bowling Green, Kentucky, United States
