= Rosa Regàs =

Spanish writer and novelist (1933–2024)

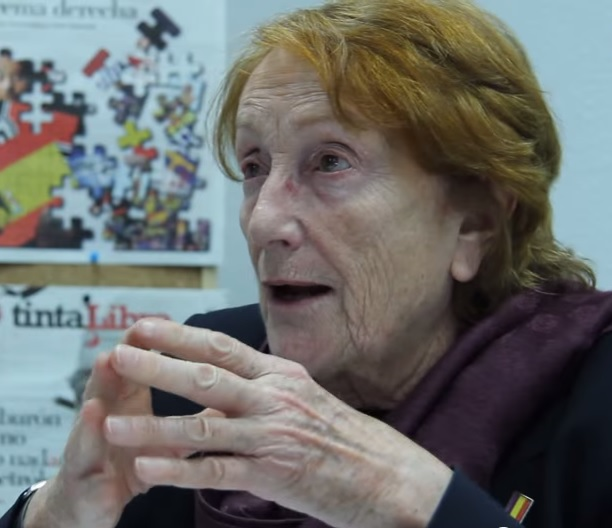
Regàs in 2014

Rosa Regàs (11 November 1933 – 17 July 2024) was a Spanish writer and novelist. She was a recipient of the Premio Planeta de Novela and the Premio Nadal.

== Biography ==
Rosa Regàs was born in Barcelona in 1933. During the Spanish Civil War, she was exiled to France, until it ended when she was 6 years old. She was educated at a religious boarding school in Barcelona. She subsequently obtained a Degree in Philosophy at the University of Barcelona, where she met Spanish poets such as José Agustín Goytisolo, Jaime Gil de Biedma and Gabriel Ferraté.

Her literary training was consolidated between 1964 and 1970 during her work at the legendary publishing house Seix Barral (now part of Grupo Planeta), with Carlos Barral. In 1970, she founded the publishing company La Gaya Ciencia and began publishing works by authors who were little known at the time, such as Juan Benet, Álvaro Pombo, María Zambrano, Manuel Vázquez Montalbán and Javier Marías, amongst many others.

After the death of Franco, she launched the publishing house's first political collection entitled Biblioteca de Divulgación Política, with most of its authors still underground at the time. She also founded and directed a magazine of thought, Cuadernos de la Gaya Ciencia, and another on architecture, Arquitecturas Bis, with the collaboration of professionals of the stature of Oriol Bohigas, Óscar Tusquets, and Rafael Moneo.

Determined to write, she sold her publishing house in 1983 and began working as a part-time translator and editor for different organisations in the United Nations in several different cities around the world, leaving her more free time to dedicate to literature. In 1987, she accepted a proposal from Carlos Trías, who was then director of the Ciudades collection at Ediciones Destino, to write "Ginebra", an entertaining essay on the severe Calvinist capital of Lake Leman and its peculiar inhabitants.

In 1991, she published Memoria de Almator, her first novel, which tells of a woman who is overprotected by her father, her husband and her lover, and ends up taking control of her own life. In 1994, she won the Premio Nadal award for her novel Azul, a story about love and the ocean, which opened the door to the general public for Regàs. Azul was followed by Viaje a la luz del Cham (1995), a narrative about her time in Syria, and Luna Lunera (1999), an autobiographical novel set in Barcelona during the post-war times, for which she won the Ciutat de Barcelona Narrative Award.

In 200,1 Regàs won the 50th edition of the Premio Planeta award with her novel of intrigue La Canción de Dorotea, which narrates the discoveries of a molecular biology professor at a country house she inherited from her father. Later, she published several works, including Diario de una abuela de verano, which was made into a television series of the same title.

From the early 1990s, Regàs regularly collaborated with newspapers and magazines through her articles, and also carried out significant work as a lecturer and activist in human rights solidarity and defence movements.

Apart from her literary activity, Regàs was also a director of the Ateneo Americano in the Casa de América in Madrid (1994–1998), as well as director general of the Spanish National Library (2004–2007).

Regàs died on 17 July 2024, at the age of 90.

== Works in chronological order ==
- Ginebra (1987)
- Memoria de Almator (1991)
- Azul (1994)
- Canciones de amor y de batalla (1995)
- Viaje a la luz del Cham (1995)
- Pobre corazón (1996)
- Desde el mar (1997)
- Más canciones (1998)
- Sangre de mi sangre: la aventura de los hijos (1998)
- Sombras, nada más (1998)
- Luna lunera (1999)
- Hi havia una vegada (2001)
- La canción de Dorotea (2001)
- Per un món millor (2002)
- Diario de una abuela de verano. El paso del tiempo (2004)
- El valor de la protesta. El compromiso con la vida (2004)
- Volcanes dormidos. Un viaje por Centroamérica (2005)
- Viento armado (2005)
- Memòries de la Costa Brava (2006)

== Literary prizes ==
- 1994 – Premio Nadal for Azul
- 1999 – Ciutat de Barcelona Narrative Award for Luna lunera
- 2001 – Premio Planeta for La canción de Dorotea
- 2013 – Premio Biblioteca Breve for Música de cámara

== Distinctions ==
- 1st Josep Pla Medal from the Catalan Association of Travel Journalists and Writers (2003)
- Knight of the French Légion d'honneur (2005)
- Saint George's Cross from the Generalitat de Catalunya (2005)
