= Mario Gandelsonas =

Argentinian-US architect

6th Dean of Princeton University School of Architecture
- In office 2015–2015
- Preceded by: Alejandro Zaera-Polo
- Succeeded by: Monica Ponce de Leon

Personal details
- Born: December 14, 1937 (age 88) Buenos Aires, Argentina
- Education: University of Buenos Aires; Centre d'études et de recherches d'architecture et d'urbanisme

Mario I. Gandelsonas (born December 14, 1937, in Buenos Aires, Argentina) is an Argentine-American architect and theorist whose specializations include urbanism and semiotics.

Gandelsonas is a founding partner of Agrest and Gandelsonas Architects, based in New York City, with Diana Agrest. In addition to his professional work, Gandelsonas is a scholar. He is currently the Class of 1913 Lecturer in Architecture at Princeton University and previously taught at Yale University.

== Education and early work ==
Mario I. Gandelsonas was born on 14 December 1937 in Buenos Aires, Argentina, the son of Lithuanian immigrants. He was educated at the University of Buenos Aires where he received a Diploma Architect in 1962, and at the Centre de Recherche d’Urbanisme in Paris, from 1967 to 1968. In 1971, the American Architect Peter Eisenman invited Gandelsonas to travel to New York as a visiting fellow to the Institute for Architecture and Urban Studies(IAUS). Gandelsonas became a fellow in 1972 and was one of the founding editors of the institute's architectural journal, Oppositions. Gandelsonas is The Class of 1913 Lecturer in Architecture at Princeton University School of Architecture and currently is the director of urban studies and the co-director of the Princeton-Mellon Initiative in Architecture, Urbanism, and the Humanities.

== Professional practice ==
In 1980, Gandelsonas became a founding partner of Agrest and Gandelsonas Architects with Diana Agrest. A unique perception of the city has formed the basis of his work. As a theorist, Gandelsonas is known for his approach to urbanism based on reading the plans of cities like they are text. His striking analytical diagrams of American cities have become a trademark for investigations into urban morphology. In the early 1990s, he developed the concept of "Vision Planning" as a new approach to his urban planning work for the city of Des Moines. The Des Moines Vision Plan contained three major propositions: reversing the flight to the suburbs and bringing back the life to downtown, the creation of a major public space, the Western Gateway Park, as a gate to downtown, and the Martin Luther King Parkway that replaced the project of a freeway loop in downtown. In 2007 Gandelsonas built upon his original vision plan by developing a new Downtown Des Moines Planning Project and completing Gateway Park with the John and Mary Pappajohn Sculpture Park. Other projects by Agrest and Gandelsonas Architects are Liberty Street in Liberty Harbor, Jersey City; the Melrose Houses Community Center in New York City; the master plan and urban design for Xu Jia Hiu in Shanghai, China; and the master plan for the West Side of Manhattan.

== Teaching and research ==
Gandelsonas taught at the Institute for Architecture and Urban Studies from 1973 until 1984 and was the director of educational programs from 1981 until 1984. Later, as a Fellow of the Chicago Institute for Architecture and Urbanism (1988–1990), he refined his approach to urbanism—based on reading the plans of cities as if they were text—with a computational analysis of the Chicago plan and published it under the title The Urban Text (1992). Throughout the decade, Gandelsonas continued to apply his unique approach to urbanism on projects in several American cities including Los Angeles, Boston, Chicago, Des Moines, New Haven and Atlantic City. He published the results of his research in the book X-Urbanism (1999), presenting his theory on the relationship between architecture and the American City.

After working as a professor at Yale University and as a guest professor at the Graduate School of Design at Harvard University, Gandelsonas joined the faculty at Princeton University in 1991, where as The Class of 1913 Lecturer in Architecture he serves as a full professor. In 1995, Gandelsonas developed a joint international studio with Tongji University in Shanghai. The China Studio, which continued until 2012, provided advanced graduate students from the School of Architecture the opportunity to explore another culture's architectural and urban existence first-hand. In 2013, he started a new joint program with the University of São Paulo incorporating design studios and research on urban infrastructure.

Gandelsonas became the first director of the Center for Architecture, Urbanism and Infrastructure (CAUI) at Princeton University in 2007 and remained in the post until 2013. With funding from Princeton University's Council for International Teaching and Research, the mission of CAUI was to build a global network of research focusing on the impact of rapid urban growth in the twenty-first century. He also published the first two CAUI books, In search of the public (2013), a collection of essays that examine the question of public space at the beginning of the twenty first century; and Garden [City] State (2013), a proposal for a slow infrastructure that takes as a case study the state of New Jersey.

From 2014 to 2018, Gandelsonas was the Princeton University lead of the research network "Fluvial Metropolis" in partnership with the University of São Paulo, a program funded by the Princeton Council for International Teaching and Research. Currently Gandelsonas is the Principal Investigator of the Meadowlands research project funded by the High Meadows Environmental Institute.

== Honors and awards ==
His work received the Excellence in Design Awards from both the New York State AIA and the New York City Chapter AIA. Gandelsonas received the Masterwork Award from the Municipal Art Society for the "Best Building in New York City" as well as the Society of American Registered Architects NY Chapter Award of Merit. In 2006 he was advanced to Fellow of the American Institute of Architects.

== Exhibitions ==
Gandelsonas' work has been exhibited in museums, galleries, and universities throughout the world. Notable exhibitions include the following: The Canadian Center for Architecture, The Museum of Contemporary Art, Los Angeles; The Walker Art Center, Minneapolis; The Dallas Museum of Art; The Fogg Museum, Harvard; Leo Castelli Gallery, New York; Centre Pompidou, Paris; Milano Triennale; Frankfurt Architecture Museum, West Germany; San Francisco Museum of Modern Art; The Architectural League, New York and the Yale University School of Architecture Gallery. His drawings have been included in the collection of the Museum of Modern Art, New York, San Francisco Museum of Modern Art, the São Paulo architecture Biennale, and the Canadian Center for Architecture.

.

== Publications ==
Books by Mario Gandelsonas:

- The Urban Text, MIT Press, 1992
- Agrest and Gandelsonas, Works, Princeton Architectural Press, 1996
- X-Urbanism, Architecture and the American City, Princeton Architectural Press, 1999
- Shanghai Reflections, Princeton Architectural Press 2002
- In Search of the Public, Notes on the American city, CAUI Publications, Island Press, 2013
- Garden [City] State, Slow Infrastructure for New Jersey, CAUI Publications, Island Press 2013
- Fluvial Metropolis, with Alexandre Delijaicov, Oscar Riera Ojeda, Publishers, 2018
