= Michael Graves College =

School of Architecture and Design in New Jersey and China

Coordinates: 40.682797926973045°N 74.23618917795656°W

- Type: Public
- Established: 2014
- Affiliations: Kean University
- Dean: David Mohney FAIA
- Location: Union, New Jersey, US
- Additional Location: Wenzhou, Zhejiang China
- Website: https://www.kean.edu/michaelgravescollege/

Michael Graves College at Kean University includes the School of Public Architecture and the Robert Busch School of Design. Kean University was originally founded in 1855, but this college, named after architect, Michael Graves, dates to 2014 and is a center for teaching and research in architectural design, history, and theory at Kean University and Wenzhou-Kean University. The college offers an undergraduate Bachelor's Degree and advanced degrees at the master's levels.

== Dean ==
- David Mohney FAIA is dean of Michael Graves College. He was previously the dean for University of Kentucky College of Design. among other positions.

== Academics ==
The Michael Graves College offers both bachelors and Master's degrees in a diverse design related subject matters, including Advertising, Architecture, Graphic Design, Industrial Design, Interior Design. The college is young, but it offers its students a diverse range of educational experience in preparation for the workplace. The program is award winning and has been featured in the press. The college provides learning experience around the world, as students are able to study at the Michael Graves Princeton, New Jersey home, the campus in Wenzhou the semester abroad in Rome and at the campus in Union Township. The college has experts in their field of study who are there to guide students on their journey toward their future.

The School of Architecture offers a professional degree (MArch). The master's degree takes two or three years to complete. A two-year requires students to hold a Bachelor of Architecture (BArch) degree and the three-year degree allows student with unrelated bachelor's degree.

The Robert Busch School of Design offers bachelors degrees in Graphic Design, Interior Design, and Industrial Design.

The faculty are split between two campuses: Union Township, New Jersey and Wenzhou China

== See also ==
- Architecture school in the United States
- Kean University
- Wenzhou-Kean University
- Architecture
- List of architecture schools
