= Ike Kligerman Barkley =

American architectural firm

- Industry: Architecture
- Founded: New York City, New York, United States (1989)
- Founder: John Ike, Thomas A. Kligerman
- Defunct: 2022
- Headquarters: New York City, Oakland, California
- Area served: International
- Key people: John Ike, Thomas A. Kligerman, Joel Barkley
- Services: Architecture, Interior design
- Number of employees: 50
- Website: Ike Kligerman Barkley

Ike Kligerman Barkley was an American architectural firm established in 1989 and dissolved in 2022. The firm had offices in New York City and the San Francisco Bay Area. The practice was led by partners and founders John Ike and Thomas A. Kligerman, and Joel Barkley, who joined as a partner in 1999. The firm designed buildings across the United States and elsewhere, and is known for residences characterized by an eclectic approach to historical precedent, style, materials and client tastes rather than for a single aesthetic. Architect, educator and architectural historian Robert A. M. Stern described the partners as "modern traditionalists" whose work was "wonderfully consistent in quality and also wonderfully inconsistent in style."

Ike Kligerman Barkley (IKB) was widely featured in publications such as Architectural Digest, Elle Decor, House Beautiful, Veranda, Luxe Interiors + Design, and Ocean Home Magazine. The firm received the New York Chapter AIA Award, the Decoration and Design Building (DDB) Stars of Design Award, and the Institute of Classical Art and Architecture's Julia Morgan and Stanford White awards, among others. It regularly appeared on Architectural Digest's annual Top 100 Designers (AD100) list beginning in 1995. Monacelli Press published two monographs by the firm, Ike Kligerman Barkley: Houses (2010) and The New Shingled House (2015). IKB's work has also been included in the books, The Art of Classical Details, Decorating in Detail by Alexa Hampton, and Inner Spaces: Paul Vincent Wiseman & The Wiseman Group, Essence of Home: Timeless Elements of Design, and New York Splendor: The City's Most Memorable Rooms.

In 2022, Ike and Kligerman dissolved Ike Kligerman Barkley to start their own firms. Kligerman Architecture & Design, based out of New York City is led by Kligerman and his partners, Joseph Carline, Andrew Forbes Davis, Margie Lavender and Ross Padluck. Ike Baker Velten, based in Oakland, California, is led by Ike and his partners Carl Baker and Tyler Velten.

== Partners and offices ==
Architects John Ike and Thomas A. Kligerman met at Columbia University and co-founded the firm, as Ike & Kligerman Architects, in 1989 in New York City. Ike (born 1954) was raised in Cincinnati, Ohio and graduated with a biochemistry degree from Colorado College, before earning a master's degree at the Columbia Graduate School of Architecture. He studied under and then worked for Robert A. M. Stern before co-founding Ike & Kligerman. Ike has a particular interest in interior design and furniture and established the firm's interiors practice. His design has combined aesthetic influences from the built legacy, regional inflections such as Italian and Scandinavian precedents (often noted during travels), and the rational influence of his science background.

Ike & Kligerman, Shinglish Country House, Deal, New Jersey, 1993

Thomas Kligerman (born 1957) earned architecture degrees from Columbia University (BA) and the Yale School of Architecture (MA), and began his career with Robert A. M. Stern Architects. He has attributed his interest in the history of domestic architecture, gardens and landscapes to his upbringing in Connecticut (where he first experienced shingled cottages) and New Mexico, and student years in England and France. Kligerman was president of The Sir John Soane’s Museum Foundation and lectures regularly on architectural history and the intersection of modern and traditional aesthetics. In 2017, he was a visiting scholar at the American Academy in Rome.

Architect and partner Joel Barkley joined the firm in 1999, forming Ike Kligerman Barkley. Barkley (born 1967, Chattanooga, Tennessee) studied at Georgia Institute of Technology (BS), Princeton University School of Architecture (MA, Architecture), and the École des Beaux-Arts at Fontainebleau. Prior to IKB, he worked for Skidmore, Owings and Merrill, Robert A. M. Stern Architects, and Diller + Scofidio. Barkley is a watercolorist who has illustrated several gardening books and maintains an organic garden. He has noted the influence of both practices on his painterly approach to the composition of houses and gardens. Barkley left the firm in 2018 to pursue his own work.

IKB's New York headquarters were located in 330 West 42nd Street, an Art Deco landmark designed by Raymond Hood in Hell's Kitchen, Manhattan. Ike initially rented space on a per-desk basis there in 1988—on the firm’s current floor—when it was an open space shared by several firms. As Ike & Kligerman, and then IKB, grew through the 1990s and 2000s, it annexed more space, finally occupying the full floor by 2012, with a staff of 30. The firm renovated the office in In 2017, creating an open, all-white, loft workspace. In 2008, IKB opened a West Coast office.

== Work ==
Architectural writers suggested that hallmarks of Ike Kligerman Barkley design included: a high regard for historical precedent, balanced by contemporary taste; an emphasis on refined detail, materials and craft; and an ability to synthesize diverse forms and styles into harmonious designs that offered unusual, even unlikely combinations. The firm's buildings incorporated the vocabularies of the Arts and Crafts movement, Art Deco, Colonial Revival, Modernism, Shingle Style, and wide-ranging precedents such as Ernest Coxhead, Michael Graves, George Howe, Harrie T. Lindeberg, Sir Edwin Lutyens, Bernard Maybeck, McKim, Mead & White, Carlo Scarpa, and John F. Staub. Robert A. M. Stern wrote of the practice's "sure command" of architectural languages of the past, noting "they build upon what went before to extend the trajectory of architecture. Commenting on the past, they say new things." The firm cites contextualism—responding to unique qualities of a site, such as light, landscape or climate, and identifying appropriate vernacular and historical references and forms—as a key tenet.

Ike Kligerman Barkley, Watch Hill Aerie, A House in Rhode Island, 2014

== Representative projects ==
IKB was primarily known for residential architecture, producing houses across the United States and internationally in contexts from beachfront and seaside villas to countryside and mountainside lodges to city lofts and townhouses. The firm also designed public buildings and commercial spaces, including the award-winning Stanford Institute for Economic Policy Research building. Although Architectural Digest and others identified the firm more by its diverse influences, refined detailing and responsiveness to site, IKB was also widely associated with the roughly 150-year-old American Shingle Style. The style is reflected in residences it built from California to New England, and its second monograph, The New Shingled House (2015). Cottages & Gardens described the firm's work in this vein as "a marriage of modernist versatility and traditional materials" which "reasserts the iconoclasm of an architecture that, now often watered-down, was once highly progressive."

=== Shingled houses ===
Period Homes called IKB's use of Shingle Style "a spur to creativity, to unorthodox speculation, to finding new answers to old questions,” that often reconciled unusual or conflicting concepts, styles, and client preferences. Ike & Kligerman's first shingle house synthesized two site-derived but contrasting styles—English Cottage (inspired by Lutyen's 1906 Folly Farm) and Shingle—into a hybrid style the firm dubbed "Shinglish." Writers described the result, Shinglish Country House (Deal, New Jersey, 1993), as whimsical, with a steeply sloping, flared roof suggesting weightlessness, and earthbound, anchored by massive curved buttresses constructed from irregular clinker bricks. The ICCA Stanford White Award-winning Black and White House (Connecticut, 2011) drew on historical English and Swedish country precedents, including details from the 18th-century home of botanist Carl Linnaeus; the rambling, two-story structure's graphic exterior featured a black-painted board-and-batten treatment with white trim on one façade and stark white stucco on the other. The Arts and Crafts Retreat (Michigan, 2003) similarly harmonized English, Swedish and pan-European elements in the crafting of its exterior and interiors. In the Southampton Beach House (Long Island, New York, 2014), the shingle style synthesized an array of forms and features: gables, dormers, flared eaves, curved outer walls, a belvedere, and a prominent, sculpturally anchoring chimney. Architectural Digest described the home as refreshing, an "authentic homage to the asymmetrical lines and inventive quirks that […] are Shingle Style's hallmarks."

IKB often placed Shingle Style in what some call "productive tension" with modernist design; its hand-hewn visual roughness and emphasis on traditional materials and craft offered a counterpoint, yet shared modernist interests in functionality and composition. For example, Watch Hill Aerie (Rhode Island, 2014) balanced classic New England Shingle vernacular with contemporary flair, drawing on the geometry of origami and the notion of a sculptor carving out form from a block of marble to create unique, near-abstract volumes. Period Homes wrote, "Architectural juxtaposition abounds in this new, old house," whose maritime-inspired shapes, colors, details and décor reflect its water-edge location. In other cases, such as Southampton Beach House and the Sagaponack House (Rhode Island, 2014), this reconciliation occurred within the homes; both combined classical shingle exteriors that match indigenous architecture with spare, modern interiors.

In other cases, the local landscape figured as a primary influence. The thrusting, muscular mountain setting of Blue Ridge Lodge (South Carolina, 2015) suggested a comparably dramatic architecture, rather than the restful horizontality often expected in waterfront houses. The resulting design's curved forms provided a sweeping elegance, while a roof pierced by three towers suggested an undulating terrain interrupted by dramatic verticals.

Ike Kligerman Barkley, Mexico Beach Retreat, Cabo San Lucas, Mexico, 2009

=== Other residential projects ===
IKB's stylistic range extended beyond Shingle Style in numerous designs responding to diverse conditions, vernacular styles and client preferences. In Green Springs Farm (Louisa, Virginia (2004), the firm reconciled the clients' desire for an informal farmhouse with a historic locale known for symmetrical, classical homes. It combined iconic formal elements of traditional southern homes with a rambling, seemingly ad-hoc assemblage of Acropolis-inspired, white Greek Revival forms. Hawaiian Longhouse (Maui, Hawaii, 2004) offered a diametrically contrasting aesthetic and geography, resurrecting the single-story, thatched-roof Polynesian longhouse style—including a soaring great room—unexpectedly paired with Shingle-Style features and a second-level master offering ocean views. In the Tropical Split-Level (Kaanapali, Hawaii, 2006), the firm distilled island, bungalow and Mediterranean elements in a contemporary design that freed the vernacular styles of strict precedent. Mexico Beach Retreat (Cabo San Lucas, Mexico, 2009) used a "divided house" approach to integrate a mandated Mexican village vernacular style with contemporary villa design; the street-facing exterior featured traditional peaked tile roofs and multipane windows, while the ocean side offered sweeping, modern rounded forms, glass expanses and a curved, dissolving pool.

In two seaside structure designs, the firm employed older European styles to respond to the structures' sites. The oceanside perch of Clifftop Villa (New Jersey, 1999) prompted an anglicized Italianate design inspired by Georgian-era architect John Nash; its classical yet asymmetrical composition presented a different character from each angle, rendered in restrained but romantic materials and colors. The tall, stone Norman House on the Sound (Greenwich, Connecticut, 2004) drew on the owners' regard for ancient Cistercian abbeys to solve the problem of an extraordinarily long and narrow waterfront property; the resulting structure was a modern house of contrasts—a loft-like floor plan, Gothic arches, gable ends, and chimneys made with venerable materials—that suggested a fragment of something once larger.

IKB also designed many city dwellings. The Loft in Tribeca (New York City, 2000) explored postindustrial vocabulary with a play between old and new, transforming a 3,600-square-foot, former butter warehouse into a modern apartment with free-floating, overlapping horizontal and vertical planes whose spaces slip into one another and escape the building's imposed industrial grid. River Oaks Townhouse (Houston, Texas, 2005) was a late-Georgian-style town house inspired by the iconic, three-story Nathaniel Russell House (1808), which combined the past with a modern mix of elements such as a wavelike balustrade and art deco stained glass window. In 2017, the firm redesigned a SoHo Loft for actress Meg Ryan.

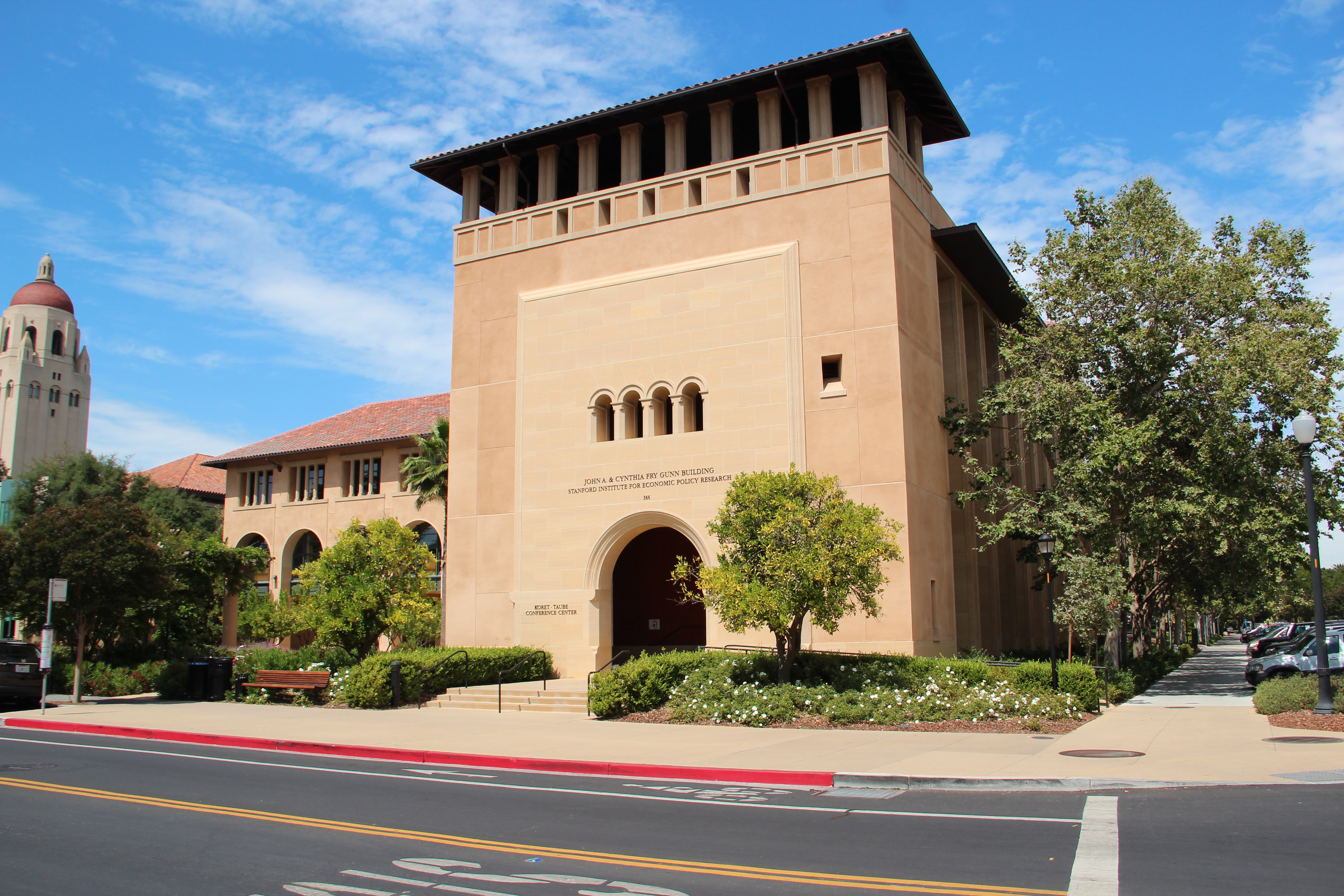
Ike Kligerman Barkley, Stanford Institute for Economic Policy Research, Stanford University, California, 2010.

=== Public buildings ===
IKB designed the Stanford Institute for Economic Policy Research building, which was recognized with an ICCA Julia Morgan Award for Excellence in the Classical Tradition. The 35,000-square foot facility's detailing and materials echo the Romanesque architecture of the campus's original quadrangles and historical Bakewell and Brown buildings. The firm's AIA design-award-winning Ramble Living Well Center (2009) in Asheville, North Carolina was notable for its sustainable elements, including a rainwater-collecting butterfly roof, passive solar and geothermal technologies, and use of local bluestone and granite materials. The firm has also designed commercial spaces, including a new 5,000-square-foot Rizzoli Bookstore flagship (2015) on the ground floor of the Beaux-Arts St. James Building (designed in 1896 by Bruce Price) in Manhattan, and an old-world industrial-styled coffee bar/retail showroom for the Manhattan textile retailer ALT for Living in the city's Flower District in 2014.

== Recognition ==
Ike Kligerman Barkley was recognized with the AIA New York Chapter Award, the Decoration and Design Building (DDB) Stars of Design Award (2013), the Institute of Classical Art and Architecture's Julia Morgan (2014) and Stanford White (2014) awards, and the Hyland Award for Excellence in Architecture (2014), among others. The firm was included in the Architectural Digest Top 100 Designers (AD100) list numerous times from 1995– 2019, the Luxe Interiors + Design Gold List (2014, 2015, 2018), New York Spaces Top 50 Designers (2014), and the Ocean Home Top Coastal Architects list (2015–8).
