= Sylvia Lavin =

American architectural historian

- Occupations: Professor of history and theory of architecture

Academic background
- Education: Barnard College (BA); Columbia University (MA, PhD)

Academic work
- Discipline: Architectural history
- Institutions: University of California, Los Angeles; Princeton University

Sylvia Lavin is a professor of history and theory of architecture at Princeton University, School of Architecture. She was previously the head of the Ph.D. in Architecture program from 2007 to 2017 and professor of architectural history and theory at UCLA, where she was chairperson of the department of architecture and urban design from 1996 to 2006. Lavin is also a frequent visitor at Harvard Graduate School of Design and was a visiting professor of architectural theory at Princeton University School of Architecture. She is a member of the board of trustees of the Canadian Centre for Architecture.

A leading figure in current debates, Lavin is known both for her scholarship and for her criticism in contemporary architecture and design. Lavin has been a fellow and a scholar in residence at the Getty Research Institute, and is the recipient of a 2011 Arts and Letters Award in Architecture from the American Academy of Arts and Letters.

In 2018, Lavin curated the exhibition Architecture Itself and Other Postmodernist Myths, which explores the impact of postmodern procedures and information-driven logic in architecture, and she previously curated the 2010 exhibition Take Note, exploring pivotal moments in the relationship between writing and architecture, both presented at the Canadian Centre for Architecture.

Her publications include The Flash in the Pan, published by the Architectural Association in 2015, and Kissing Architecture, published by Princeton University Press in 2011. She is an editor of Crib Sheets, a compilation of polemical writings and sound bites on current buzzwords, issued by Monacelli Press, and her Form Follows Libido: Architecture and Richard Neutra in a Psychoanalytic Culture was published by MIT Press in 2005.

She received her M.A. and Ph.D. from Columbia University (GSAPP) and her B.A. from Barnard College. Lavin's dissertation was published as Quatremère de Quincy and the Invention of a Modern Language of Architecture by MIT Press in 1992.

== Publications ==
- The Flash in the Pan and Other Forms of Architectural Contemporaneity, Architectural Association Publications, 2015
- Kissing Architecture, Princeton University Press, 2011
- Crib Sheets: Notes on the Contemporary Architectural Conversation (Editor), Monacelli Press, 2005
- Form Follows Libido: Architecture and Richard Neutra in a Psychoanalytic Culture, MIT Press, 2005
- Quatremere de Quincy and the Invention of a Modern Language of Architecture, MIT Press, 1992
