= Kenneth Frampton =

British architect, critic and historian

Kenneth Frampton Hon FRIBA
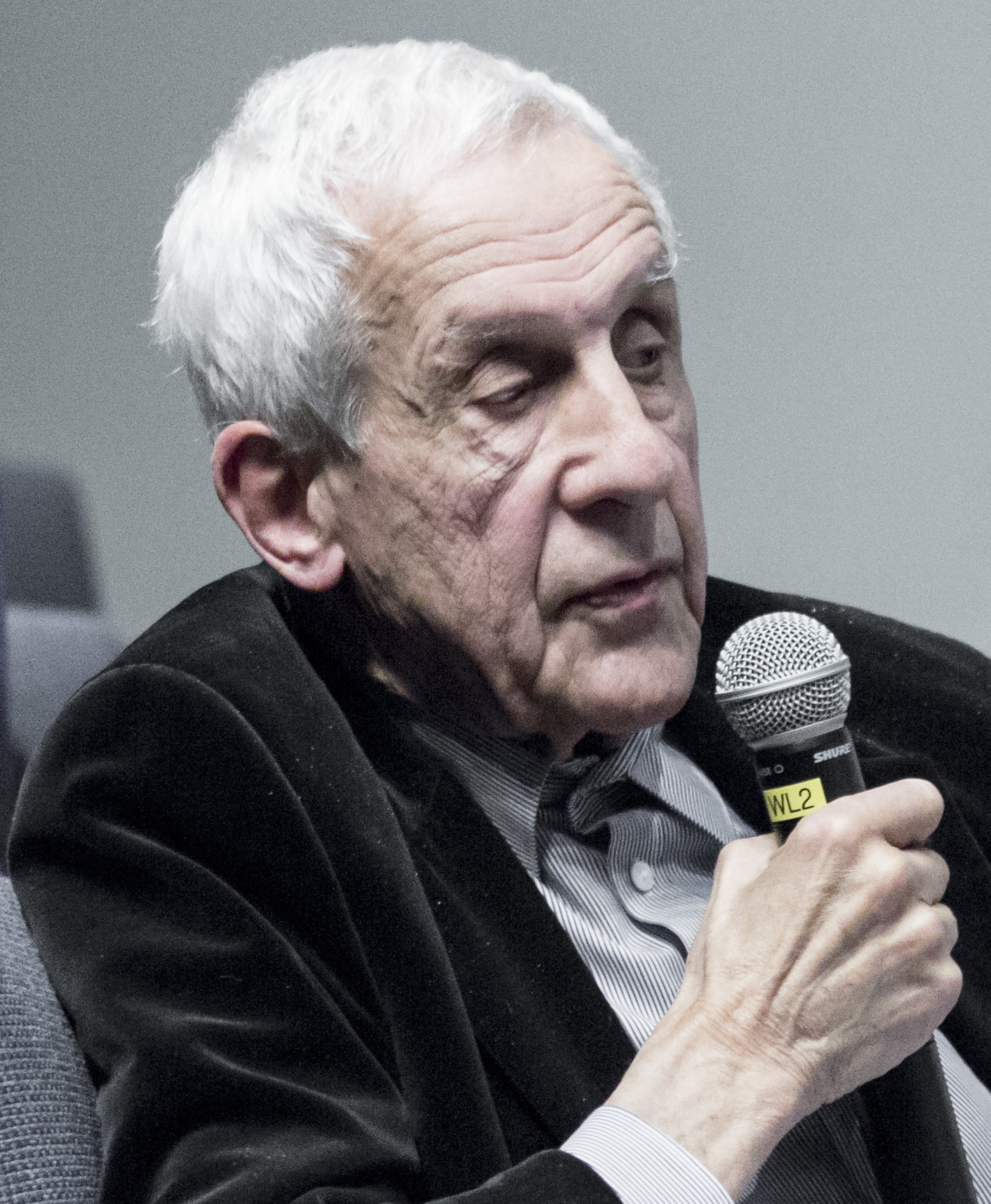
- Kenneth Frampton at GSAPP (2014)
- Born: Kenneth Brian Frampton; 20 November 1930 (age 95); Woking, Surrey, England
- Occupations: Architect; critic; historian
- Notable work: Modern Architecture: A Critical History; Towards a Critical Regionalism

Kenneth Brian Frampton CBE (born 20 November 1930) is a British architect, critic and historian. He is regarded as one of the world's leading historians of modernist architecture and contemporary architecture. He is an Emeritus Professor of Architecture at the Graduate School of Architecture, Planning, and Preservation at Columbia University, New York, where he taught for over 50 years. He is a citizen of Britain and the United States.

== Biography ==
Frampton studied architecture at Guildford School of Art and the Architectural Association School of Architecture, London. Subsequently, he worked in Israel, with Middlesex County Council and Douglas Stephen and Partners (1961–66) in London, during which time he was also a visiting tutor at the Royal College of Art (1961–64), tutor at the Architectural Association (1961–63) and technical editor of the journal Architectural Design (AD) (1962–65). While working for Douglas Stephen and Partners he designed in 1960-62 the Corringham Building, an 8-story block of flats in Bayswater, London, the architecture of which is distinctively modernist; in 1998 it became protected as a listed building.

Frampton has also taught at Princeton University School of Architecture (1966–71) and the Bartlett School of Architecture, London, (1980). He has been a member of Columbia University's faculty since 1972, and that year he became a fellow of the Institute for Architecture and Urban Studies in New York (whose members also included Peter Eisenman, Manfredo Tafuri and Rem Koolhaas) and a co-founding editor of its magazine Oppositions.

In 2017 the Canadian Centre for Architecture, which holds Frampton's archive, held an exhibition titled Educating Architects: Four Courses by Kenneth Frampton that examined aspects of his teaching at Columbia University, that informed his key publications.

Frampton was appointed Commander of the Order of the British Empire (CBE) in the 2021 Birthday Honours for services to architecture.

In 2015, Frampton's library was acquired by the Department of Architecture, The University of Hong Kong.

== Writings on architecture ==
Frampton is especially well known for his writing on twentieth- and twenty-first century architecture, and for his central role in the development of architectural phenomenology. His books include Modern Architecture: A Critical History (1980; revised 1985, 1992, 2007 and 2020) and Studies in Tectonic Culture (1995). Frampton achieved great prominence (and influence) in architectural education with his essay "Towards a Critical Regionalism: Six Points for an Architecture of Resistance" (1983) – the term, critical regionalism, had been coined by Alexander Tzonis and Liane Lefaivre in 1981. In this paper, he mounts a criticism of globalisation, mass consumer culture and the impact that this has had on architecture. For Frampton, this represents a particularly salient issue within the Modern Movement, as it has pushed architecture toward mediocrity, sameness and urban form that lacks any kind of cultural relevance or specificity. To remedy this, Frampton argues that the adoption of a critical regionalist approach is required in architecture, one that takes into account specific considerations of place, topography, climate, and culture, as well as an emphasis on the tectonic and tactile rather than the merely scenographic.

Frampton's essay was included in the book The Anti-Aesthetic. Essays on Postmodern Culture, edited by Hal Foster, though Frampton is critical of postmodernism in architecture. Frampton's own position attempts to defend a version of modernism that looks to either critical regionalism or a 'momentary' understanding of the autonomy of architectural practice in terms of its own concerns with form and tectonics, which cannot be reduced to economics (whilst conversely retaining a Leftist viewpoint regarding the social responsibility of architecture). He summed up his critical stance towards postmodernist architecture and its advocates' belief in the primacy of architecture as a language as follows:

It seems to me that we cannot escape from two aspects of architecture which I tried to identify ... as ontological tectonic and representational tectonic. Representation certainly cannot be removed from architecture any more that it can be removed from other discourses. ... In my opinion, it is of the utmost importance that the ontological and representational aspects of architecture be maintained as a dialogical interaction. I think that the attempt to isolate atomized elements such as morphemes is, in the end, a kind of reductive pseudo-scientific project, which just leaves you with the banality of pieces such as 'a door is a sign of a door' rather than with any notion as to the socio-cultural, complex desire of the species-being to realise itself, collectively.

In 2002 a collection of Frampton's writings over a period of 35 years was collated and published under the title Labour, Work, and Architecture. An English translation of his 2015 book, The Other Modern Movement, was published in 2021. Later books include Architecture and the Public World, 2025. In addition to his own scholarly research and criticism, Frampton has frequently furthered the intellectual reach of his work through writing introductions, prefaces and forewords for other authors and publications on allied themes.

== Select list of Frampton's writings ==
- "Towards a Critical Regionalism: Six Points for an Architecture of Resistance", in The Anti-Aesthetic: Essays on Postmodern Culture, edited by Hal Foster, Bay Press, Port Townsen, 1983.
- (with David Larkin, ed.) The Twentieth Century American House. Masterworks of Residential Architecture, Thames and Hudson, London, 1995.
- Studies in Tectonic Culture: The Poetics of Construction in Nineteenth and Twentieth Century Architecture, MIT Press, Cambridge, Mass., 1995.
- Álvaro Siza. Complete Works, Phaidon, London, 2000 ISBN 9780714840048
- Le Corbusier (World of Art). Thames & Hudson, London, 2001.
- Labour, Work and Architecture. Phaidon Press, London, 2002.
- "Ando at the Millennium", in Tadao Ando: Light and Water, Book Design by Massimo Vignelli, The Monacelli Press, New York, 2003.
- The Evolution of 20th-Century Architecture: A Synoptic Account, Springer, New York, 2006.
- (with Strauven F., Gübler J., Verpoest L.) Georges Baines, Ludion, Gent, 2006.
- Modern Architecture: A Critical History (World of Art), Thames & Hudson, London, 1985; fifth edition 2020.
- (with David Larkin, ed.) American Masterworks: Houses of the Twentieth & Twenty-First Centuries, Rizzoli, New York, 2008.
- Five North American Architects: An Anthology by Kenneth Frampton, Lars Muller, Zurich, 2012.
- Genealogy of Modern Architecture: A Comparative Critical Analysis of Built Form, Lars Muller, Zurich, 2014.
- (with Ludovica Molo, ed.) L'altro Movimento Moderno, Mendrisio Academy Press/Silvana Editoriale, Mendrisio-Milan, 2015.

Writings on Kenneth Frampton

- Daniel Sherer, "Architecture in the Labyrinth. Theory and Criticism in the United States: Oppositions, Assemblage, ANY (1973–1999)", Zodiac 20, 1999, 36–63.
- Jorge Otero-Pailos, Architecture's Historical Turn: Phenomenology and the Rise of the Postmodern, University of Minnesota Press, Minneapolis, 2010, 183–250.
- Tom Avermaete, Veronique Patteeuw, Hans Teerds, Lea-Catherine Szacka (eds), Oase #103: Critical Regionalism Revisited, 2019 ISBN 9789462084865.
- Karla Cavarra Britton and Robert McCarter, editors, Modern Architecture in the Lifeworld: Essays in Honor of Kenneth Frampton, Thames & Hudson, 2020 ISBN 9780500343630.
- Stylianos Giamarelos, Resisting Postmodern Architecture: Critical Regionalism before Globalisation, UCL Press, London, 2022. DOI: https://doi.org/10.14324/111.9781800081338

== Awards ==
- 2005 Architectural League of New York President's Medal
- 2011 Honorary Fellowship of the Royal Institute of the Architects of Ireland
- 2012 Schelling Architecture Theory Prize
- 2014 Lisbon Triennale Millennium BCP Lifetime Achievement Award
- 2018 Golden Lion for Lifetime Achievement, Venice Biennale of Architecture
- 2019 Soane Medal
- 2021 Commander of the Order of the British Empire (CBE); 2021 Queen's Birthday Honours
- 2022 Thomas Jefferson Foundation Medal in Architecture,
