= Stellar Works =

Furniture brand

Stellar Works is a furniture brand based in Shanghai. Yuichiro Hori is the founder and CEO with creative direction by Neri&Hu architects Lyndon Neri and Rossana Hu.

== Overview ==
Stellar Works was established and launched at Salone del Mobile in 2012. The company manufactures dining chairs, lounge chairs, stools, bar chairs, benches, tables, cabinets, shelving, carts, ottomans, beds, lighting and accessories for both commercial and residential sectors. Stellar Works also manufactures re-issued designs by Jens Risom, Vilhelm Wolhert, and Carlo Forcolini.

Stellar Works has supplied furniture for hospitality projects as well as cultural venues such as the Louisiana Museum of Modern Art.

Stellar Works’s products have won awards including Wallpaper* Smart Space Awards (2021), Best of Year by Interior Design Magazine (2020), Archiproducts Awards (2018) and Wallpaper* Design Awards (2017).

== Designers ==
Stellar Works has worked with designers including Neri&Hu, nendo, Yabu Pushelberg, David Rockwell, Michele De Lucchi, Space Copenhagen, Sebastian Herkener and Luca Nichetto.
