= Guy Nordenson =

Guy Nordenson (born 1955) is a structural engineer and professor of structural engineering and architecture at Princeton University School of Architecture. Guy has two children, Pierre and Sebastien Nordenson. He attended the Massachusetts Institute of Technology, graduating with a Bachelor of Science in Civil Engineering in 1977, followed by a Masters of Science in Structural Engineering and Structural Mechanics from the University of California at Berkeley in 1978. After graduating from UC Berkeley he worked at Forell/Elsesser Engineers in San Francisco (1978-1982) and Weidlinger Associates in New York City (1982–1987), before establishing the New York office of Ove Arup & Partners in 1987 where he was a director until leaving in 1997 to begin his own structural engineering practice, Guy Nordenson and Associates.

Nordenson is also a professor at the Princeton University School of Architecture and is a Faculty Associate at the Andlinger Center for Energy and the Environment, the University Center for Human Values, the Princeton Environmental Institute, and the Department of Civil and Environmental Engineering.

== Climate Adaptation and Flood Research ==
In 2007 Nordenson and his collaborators were awarded the Latrobe Prize by the AIA College of Fellows for their proposal “On the Water” a plan that presents ideas for future waterfront development along the New York and New Jersey Upper Bay. Nordenson said of the prize “[The Latrobe Prize] is a chance to bring architects, engineers, and others together to think about the possibility of using the challenges associated with climate change as a way to rethink the character of the waterfront, in particular the New York Upper Bay, but also by extension other similar regions around the country.” In 2010 the research was published in book form as On the Water | Palisade Bay by Hatje Cantz and also served as the inspiration for the MoMA's Rising Currents: Projects for New York’s Waterfront that same year. Nordenson remains active in climate adaptation research, and after Hurricane Sandy was appointed to the NYS 2100 Commission by Governor Cuomo. Nordenson is also the Project Director of Structures of Coastal Resilience a Rockefeller Foundation-supported project dedicated to studying and proposing resilient designs for urban coastal environments in the North Atlantic region. With Princeton University he has participated in the 2018 Northeastern Legislative Climate and Energy Summit, where he discussed innovative approaches to making coastal communities more resilient to a changing climate and took part in the Princeton University's "Ideas Lab" panel and workshop on climate change at the annual World Economic Forum in Davos, Switzerland.

== Projects ==
Guy Nordenson was the structural engineer for the Museum of Modern Art expansion in New York, the Jubilee Church in Rome, the Simmons Residence Hall at MIT in Massachusetts, and numerous other projects including:

- Menil Drawing Institute, Houston TX (Johnston Marklee)
- Corning Museum of Glass Expansion, Corning NY (Thomas Phifer and Partners)
- National Museum of African American History and Culture, Washington DC (Freelon Adjaye Bond/Smith Group)
- Kimbell Art Museum Expansion, Fort Worth TX (Renzo Piano Building Workshop/Kendall Heaton Associates)
- Asian Culture Complex, Guangju SOUTH KOREA (Kyu Sung Woo Architects)
- Yale Hillhouse Bridges, New Haven CT (designer and structural engineer with Pelli Clarke Pelli Architects)
- Nanjing Sifang Art Museum, Nanjing CHINA (Steven Holl Architects)
- Ruth Lilly Visitors Pavilion, Indianapolis IN (Marlon Blackwell Architect)
- Linked Hybrid Residential Towers, Beijing CHINA (Steven Holl Architects)
- New Museum of Contemporary Art, New York NY (Kazuyo Sejima and Ryue Nishizawa/SANAA)
- Bloch Building, Nelson-Atkins Museum of Art, Kansas City MO (Steven Holl Architects)
- Toledo Museum of Art Glass Pavilion, Toledo OH (Kazuyo Sejima and Ryue Nishizawa/SANAA with Sasaki Structural Consultants)
- Bridges Center, Memphis TN (Building Studio with Coleman Coker Architects)
- Museum of Modern Art Expansion, New York NY (Taniguchi and Associates with Severud Associates)
- Jubilee Church, Rome ITALY (Richard Meier & Partners Architects)
- MIT Simmons Hall Residence, Cambridge MA (Steven Holl Architects)
- Austrian Cultural Institute, New York NY (Raimund Abraham Architect)
- Televisa Cafeterias, San Angel and Chapultepec, Mexico City MEXICO (TEN Arquitectos)
- Rachofsky House and Art Gallery, Dallas TX (Richard Meier & Partners Architects)
- Weatherstone Riding Ring, Sharon CT (Cooper Robertson Architects)

== Selected publications ==
- Structures of Coastal Resilience, with Catherine Seavitt Nordenson and Julia Chapman, Island Press, Washington DC, 2018
- Reading Structures: 39 Projects and Built Works, Lars Müller Publishers, Zurich, 2016
- Patterns and Structure: Selected Writings 1972–2008, Lars Müller Publishers, Baden, 2010
- On the Water | Palisade Bay, with Catherine Seavitt and Adam Yarinsky, Hatje Cantz Verlag/MoMA Publications, Berlin, 2010
- Seven Structural Engineers – The Felix Candela Lectures in Structural Engineering, editor, MoMA Publications, New York NY, 2008
- Tall Buildings, editor with Terrance Riley, MoMA Publications, New York NY, 2003
- WTC Emergency – Damage Assessment of Buildings Structural Engineers Association of NY Inspection of September and October 2001, Volume A Summary Report, and B-F on DVD, SEAoNY, New York NY, 2003

== Affiliations ==
- Fellow, American Academy of Arts and Sciences
- Fellow, American Society of Civil Engineers
- Founder, and past President, Structural Engineers Association of New York
- Commissioner, NYS 2100 Commission, New York State, Office of Governor Andrew Cuomo
- Commissioner and Secretary, New York City Public Design Commission
- Member, Judd Foundation Buildings Committee

== Selected awards ==
- 2019 Alumni Award of Distinction, Phillips Academy Andover
- 2018–2019 Honorary Member, Structural Engineers Association of New York
- 2017 Richard Neutra Award for Professional Excellence from the Cal Poly Pomona Department of Architecture
- 2016 "Most Admired Educators for 2016” by DesignIntelligence
- 2009 AIA Institute Honors for Collaborative Achievement
- 2009 William A. Bernoudy Architect in Residence, American Academy in Rome
- 2008 Premio Mario Pani Award
- 2003 Arts and Letters Awards in Architecture
