= Space Copenhagen =

Danish design studio

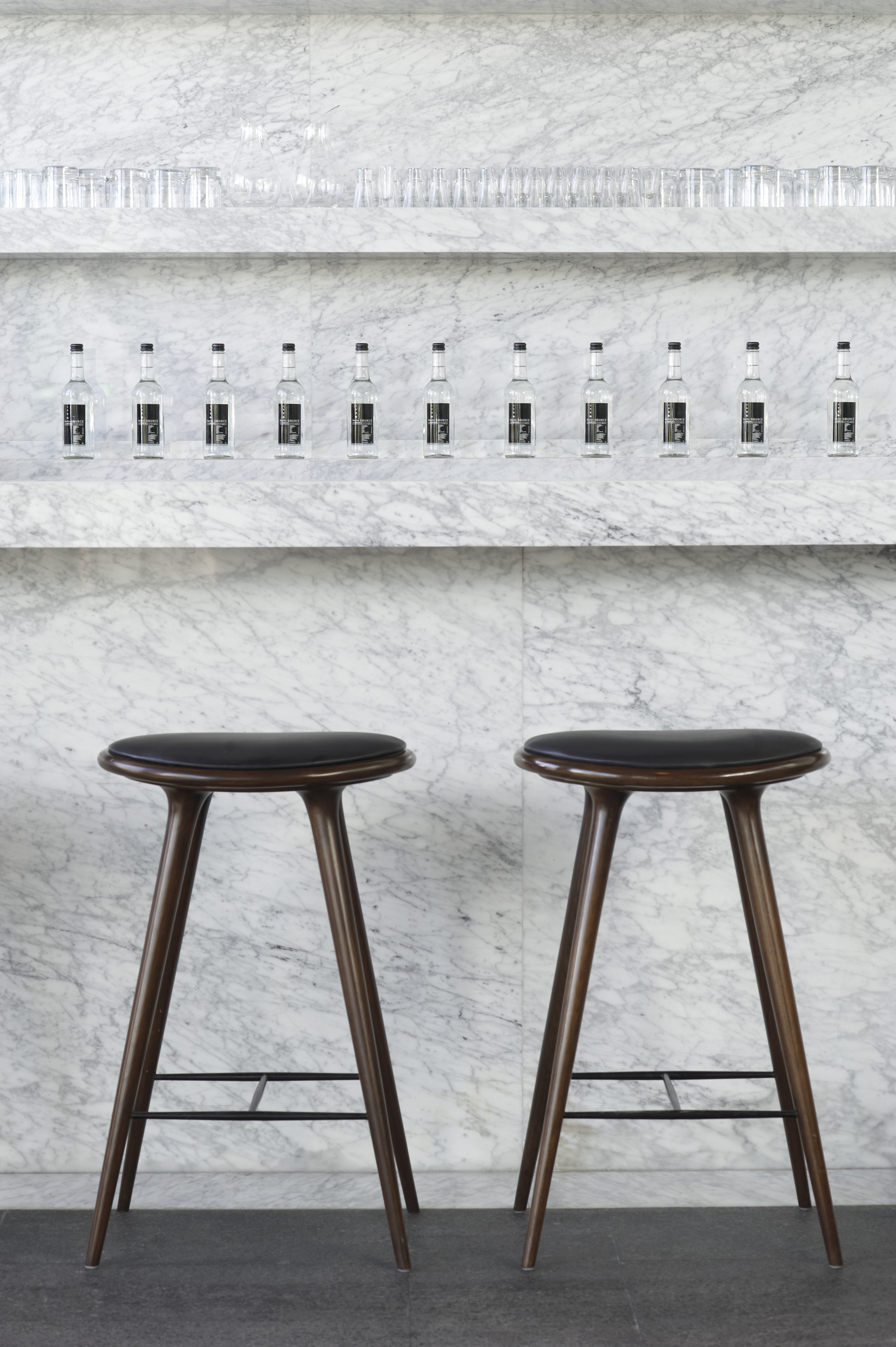
- High Stool by Space Copenhagen for Mater
- Founded: 2005; 20 years ago
- Founders: Peter Bundgaard Rützou; Signe Bindslev Henriksen
- Headquarters: Copenhagen, Denmark
- Website: spacecph.dk

Space Copenhagen is a design studio based in Copenhagen, founded in 2005 by Peter Bundgaard Rützou and Signe Bindslev Henriksen. The studio works across disciplines from interior design for private homes, hotels and restaurants globally to art installations and art direction, furniture, lighting and refined objects.

Space Copenhagen has worked on projects including high-end restaurants such as Restaurant Noma, awarded 1st by The World's 50 Best Restaurants, and Restaurant Geranium by Bocuse d'Or winner Rasmus Kofoed, as well as Le Pristine and Blueness in Antwerp, Esmée in Copenhagen and Mammertsberg in Switzerland. Hotel interiors projects include the 11 Howard hotel in New York, The Stratford in London and SAS Royal in Copenhagen.

Space Copenhagen has also designed for furniture brands such as Fredericia Furniture, Mater, &tradition, Gubi and Stellar Works.
