= Robert Geddes (architect) =

American architect (1923–2023)

Robert Louis Geddes
- Born: December 7, 1923; Philadelphia, Pennsylvania, U.S.
- Died: February 13, 2023 (aged 99) near Princeton, New Jersey, U.S.
- Education: University of California, Berkeley; Yale University; Harvard University
- Occupation: Architect
- Spouse: Evelyn Geddes (m. 1947; died 2020)
- Children: 2
- Awards: FAIA; Architecture Firm Award 1979; Honorary doctorate, Princeton University, 2018; Honorary doctorate, City College of New York, 1999; Honorary doctorate, New Jersey Institute of Technology, 1988
- Practice: Geddes Brecher Qualls Cunningham Architects; GBQC Architects
- Website: robertgeddesarchitect.com

Robert Louis Geddes (December 7, 1923 – February 13, 2023) was an American architect, planner, writer, educator, past principal of the firm Geddes Brecher Qualls Cunningham (GBQC), and dean emeritus of the Princeton University School of Architecture (1965-1982). As principal of GBQC, select major projects include Pender Labs at the Moore School of Electrical Engineering, University of Pennsylvania, the Philadelphia Police Headquarters, the Liberty State Park master plan, the Philadelphia Center City master plan, and his best-known work, the Dining Commons, Birch Garden, and Academic Building at the Institute for Advanced Study.

He was a Fellow of the American Institute of Architects; recipient of honorary doctorates from Princeton University, City College of New York, and the New Jersey School of Architecture/NJIT; recipient of the Topaz Award from the American Institute of Architects and the Association of Collegiate Schools of Architecture, and, along with his firm, was the recipient of the Architecture Firm Award.

== Background ==
Geddes was born Robert Leon Goldberg on December 7, 1923, in Philadelphia, the only child of Louis J. Geddes (born Goldberg) and Kate Geddes (born Malmed), both of Ukrainian-Jewish families settled in Woodbine, New Jersey, by Maurice de Hirsch. He grew up and attended elementary school in Ventnor City, New Jersey; John Burroughs Middle School in the Hancock Park, Los Angeles

Robert Geddes

1st Dean of Princeton University School of Architecture
- In office 1965–1982
- Preceded by: Position Established
- Succeeded by: Robert Maxwell

neighborhood of Los Angeles; and graduated from Atlantic City High School in 1941. He started university studies at the University of California, Berkeley, transferring to Yale University in the fall of 1942 due to concerns over transcontinental travel after the start of World War II. His university studies were interrupted by three years in the United States Army Air Forces from 1942 to 1945. He left Yale in 1947 for the Harvard Graduate School of Design, where he earned an M. Arch. in 1950.

== Career ==
=== Architect ===
In 1953, he co-founded a collaborative practice, Geddes Brecher Qualls Cunningham: Architects (also known as GBQC Architects), in Philadelphia, later adding an office in Princeton. Prior to founding GBQC, he worked briefly for Hugh Stubbins, Jr. in Cambridge, Massachusetts. GBQC won national and international competitions and awards, starting with being runner-up in the Sydney Opera House design competition (1955). He was GBQC design partner or co-partner for the Pender Labs at the Moore School of Electrical Engineering at the University of Pennsylvania; the Police Headquarters of the City of Philadelphia; Richard Stockton College in New Jersey; Hill Hall at Rutgers University-Newark; the College of Liberal Arts of Southern Illinois University; the Architects Housing in Trenton, New Jersey; Princeton Community Housing's Griggs Farm neighborhood; and probably best known, the Dining Hall and Birch Garden quad at the Institute for Advanced Study in Princeton. He was elected a Fellow of the National Academy of Design, and GBQC was awarded the highest professional honor of the American Institute for Architects, the Architecture Firm Award (1979), for "design quality, respect for the environment, and social concern."

=== Urbanism ===
He was the urban design consultant for the Center City Plan of Philadelphia (1988), and for the Third Regional Plan of New York for the Regional Plan Association (1996). GBQC won first prize in the international design competition for Vienna-South urban extension (1972), and the GBQC master plan for Liberty State Park was exhibited in the Museum of Modern Art (1979). He worked with the City University of New York's Newman Institute on alternatives for the Hudson Yards in midtown Manhattan. He co-founded the civic association, Princeton Future, which created the concept design for the new plaza, housing and parking in downtown Princeton, New Jersey. For the United Nations Center for Human Settlements, he directed the "UNCHS Conference on Cities in North America", produced its report "Cities in Our Future", published by Island Press, and wrote for the journal American Prospect, "Metropolis Unbound: The Sprawling American City and the Search for Alternatives."

=== Education ===
After studying at the Harvard Graduate School of Design in the post-war Walter Gropius and Joseph Hudnut era, he taught architecture and civic design at the University of Pennsylvania School of Design (formerly University of Pennsylvania Graduate School of Fine Arts) from 1951 to 1965.

He moved to Princeton University in 1965 to become the first Dean of the School of Architecture, and was William Kennan Professor Emeritus. Under his leadership over 17 years, the School of Architecture emerged as a major center for the exchange of architectural ideas, while retaining its small size and close connections with the rest of the university.

During his time as Dean, the School admitted women for the first time in 1968, advanced academic research was conducted on this historic threshold by Dr. Meral Ekincioglu with MIT-Architecture Department's academic sponsorship. (https://www.youtube.com/watch?v=P-Bcie-0p8Q&t=253s).

In 1990, he was appointed the Henry Luce Professor of Architecture, Urbanism, and History at New York University, and was elected a Fellow of the New York Institute for the Humanities. He pioneered in connecting architecture with the humanities and social sciences, and with public affairs and urban design, and is best known for his undergraduate course at Princeton and NYU, Architecture 101, "Buildings, Landscapes, and Cities." He was co-author of the Princeton Report on Architectural Education for the American Institute of Architects (1967).

=== Personal life and death ===
Geddes and his wife, Evelyn, had two children and were married for 73 years until her death in 2020. Geddes died at his home near Princeton, New Jersey, on February 13, 2023, at the age of 99.

== Selected works: Architecture ==
• Pender Labs, Moore School of Electrical Engineering, University of Pennsylvania (1958, demolished 2003)
• Sydney Opera House, Sydney, Australia. Second place in an international design competition (1955)
• Philadelphia Police Headquarters (1960)
• Caesar Rodney Residence Hall Complex, University of Delaware (1966)
• Hill Hall, Rutgers University–Newark (1967)
• Institute for Advanced Study. Dining Commons, Birch Garden, and Academic Building. Princeton, New Jersey (1970–72)
• Corning, New York Main Street Renewal (1972)
• Stockton University (then Rickard Stockton College). Master plan and building design (1970–76)
• Architects Housing Company, Trenton, New Jersey. Affordable senior housing (1975)
• Rutgers University–New Brunswick, Piscataway campus. Psychology building (1975)
• Rutgers University–New Brunswick, Livingston campus. Student Center (1985)
• Trexler Library, Muhlenberg College. Allentown, Pennsylvania (1988)
• Princeton Community Housing. Affordable housing (1989)
• Environmental and Health Science Laboratory, Mobile Oil Corporation Technical Center, Hopewell, New Jersey (1989)

== Selected works: Urbanism ==
• Vienna-South urban expansion (1972)
• Liberty State Park, Jersey City, New Jersey (1974–84)
• Philadelphia City Center. Master plan (1988)
