= Stan Allen =

American architect

- Born: January 17, 1956 (age 69)
- Education: Brown University (B.A. 1978) Cooper Union (B.Arch. 1981) Princeton (M.Arch. 1988)
- Occupation(s): Architect, theorist

Stan Allen

4th Dean of Princeton University School of Architecture
- In office 2002–2012
- Preceded by: Ralph Lerner
- Succeeded by: Alejandro Zaera-Polo

Stan Allen (born 1956) is an American architect, theorist and former dean of Princeton University School of Architecture.

== Biography ==
He received a B.A. from Brown University, a B.Arch. from Cooper Union and an M.Arch. from Princeton University. He has worked in the offices of Richard Meier and Rafael Moneo, and was formerly the director, with landscape architect James Corner at Field Operations. The work of this interdisciplinary collaboration was recognized with first prizes in invited competitions for the re-use of Fresh Kills in Staten Island (2001), and the Arroyo Parkway in Pasadena, California (2002). His practice, Stan Allen Architect, is based in New York City.

Prior to his move to Princeton in 2002, Allen directed the AAD (Advanced Architectural Design) Program at Columbia Graduate School of Architecture, Planning and Preservation. In 2012, Allen was elected into the National Academy of Design.

His urban projects have been published in Points and Lines: Diagrams and Projects for the City (New York: Princeton Architectural Press, 1999, reissued in 2004) and his theoretical essays in Practice: Architecture, Technique and Representation, reissued in 2008 by Routledge. Landform Building: Architecture’s New Terrain, a 450 page book based on the conference held at the School in 2009, was published by Lars Muller in 2011.

== Projects ==
- 2004 Taichung Shuinan Economic and Trade Park, Taiwan
- 2006-08 Christ's Church of the Valley (CCV) Chapel, Tagaytay, Philippines

== Publications ==
- 1999 Points + Lines: Diagrams and Projects for the City, Princeton Architectural Press
- 2013 "Stan Allen by Nader Tehrani", BOMB Magazine
