= Kevin Kennon =

American architect

Paul Kevin Kennon
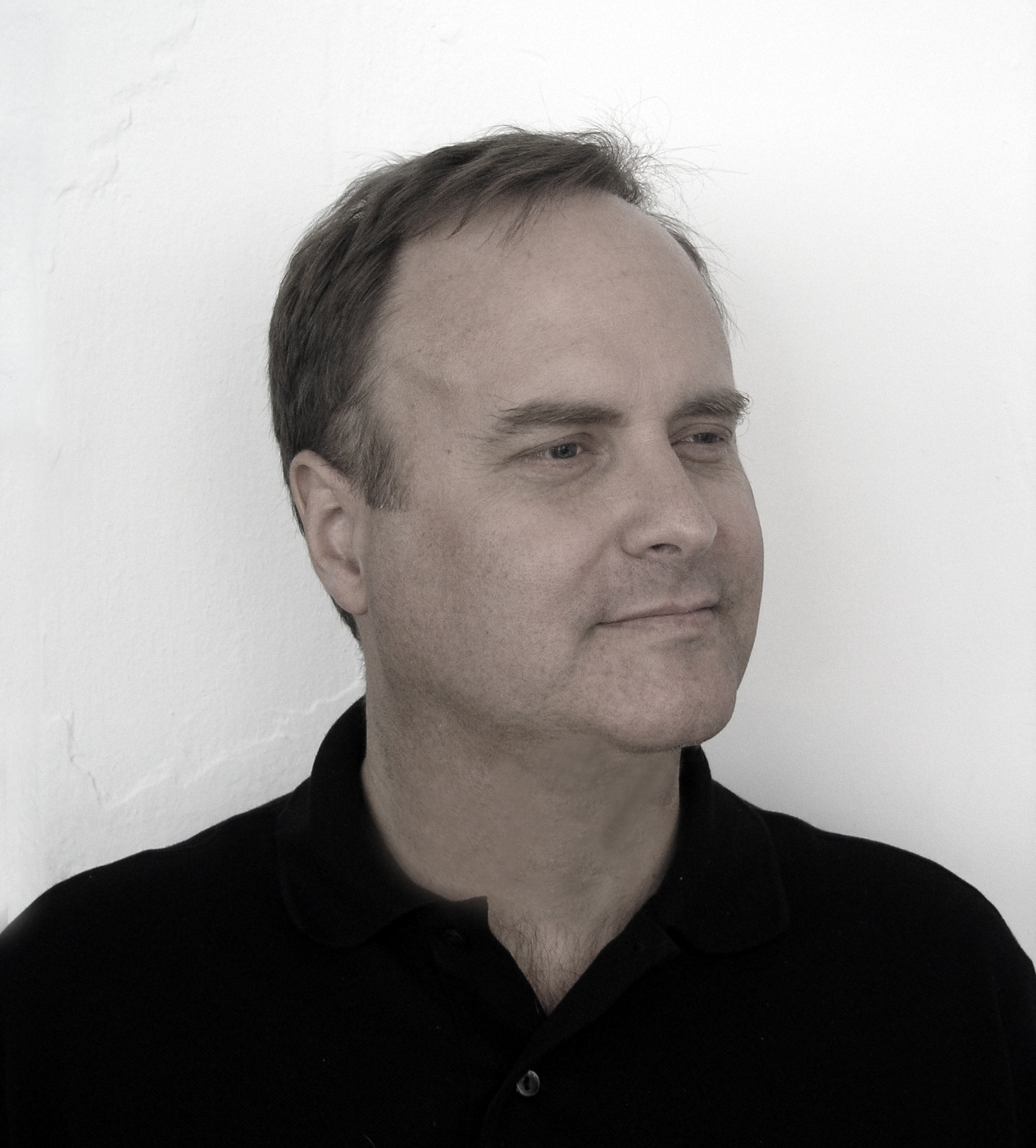
- Kennon in 2009
- Born: July 12, 1958 (age 68); Palos Verdes, California
- Occupation: Architect
- Practice: Kevin Kennon Architects
- Buildings: Rodin Museum Samsung Plaza (Kohn Pedersen Fox, Kevin Kennon Design Principal), Columbus Indiana Learning Center (Kohn Pedersen Fox, Kevin Kennon Design Principal), World Trade Center Competition Design, Bloomingdale's Glendale, Bloomingdale's Santa Monica, Tian Fang Tower

Kevin Kennon (born July 12, 1958 in Palos Verdes, California) is an American architect. Kennon is the Director of the Institute for Architecture and Urban Studies and is a founding principal of United Architects, a finalist in the prestigious 2002 World Trade Center Design Competition organized by the Lower Manhattan Development Corporation.

== Biography ==
Kennon is the son of Paul A. Kennon, an architect who served as dean of the School of Architecture at Rice University. Kennon graduated from Amherst College with a bachelor's degree in literature and pursued architecture studies in The Institute for Architecture and Urban Studies in 1978. In 1988, he joined Kohn Pedersen Fox (KPF) in New York and became a partner in 1996. Kennon left KPF in 2002 and established his office in New York City, and has served as director of The Institute for Architecture and Urban Studies since 2001.

In 2002 he founded Kevin Kennon Architects, an architecture and design firm based in New York City.

As a founding principal of United Architects, Kevin Kennon was a finalist in the prestigious 2002 World Trade Center Design Competition organized by the Lower Manhattan Development Corporation. His work has been exhibited widely and is in the Permanent Collection of the Museum of Modern Art. He has received major design awards ranging from the American Institute of Architects, the Architectural League Young Architects Award, and the Progressive Architecture Award. His monograph, “Architecture Tailored” DD Publication #16, was published in 2006. He has taught at Yale University, Princeton University, the Cooper Union, and Columbia University and has lectured at Princeton, Yale, Rice, University of Houston, Amherst College, and the Architectural League of New York.

Kevin Kennon is the Executive Director of the Paul Kennon Memorial Symposium at Rice University, Houston, and Executive Director of the Institute for Architecture and Urban Studies. The Institute is a not-for-profit educational organization that provides an introduction to the culture of architecture. He was also a founder and Chairman of the Beaux-Arts Ball for the Architectural League from 1989-91.

== Notable projects ==
- 100 William Street
- American Express Building, 157 Hudson Street New York
- Bloomingdale's Chestnut Hill
- Bloomingdale's Costa Mesa
- Bloomingdale's Fashion Island Newport
- Bloomingdale's Glendale
- Bloomingdale's Miami
- Bloomingdale's Orlando
- Bloomingdale's Palo Alto
- Bloomingdale's San Francisco at Westfield San Francisco Centre
- Bloomingdale's Santa Monica at Santa Monica Place
- Columbus Indiana Learning Center (Kohn Pedersen Fox, Kevin Kennon Design Principal)
- Glendale Galleria
- Incubator Arts Project
- Lehman Brothers Headquarters (Kohn Pedersen Fox, Kevin Kennon Design Principal)
- Macy's Herald Square
- Pier 17
- Rodin Gallery
- Samsung Headquarters (Kohn Pedersen Fox, Kevin Kennon Design Principal)
- Sanya Resort
- Sotheby’s Headquarters (Kohn Pedersen Fox, Kevin Kennon Design Principal)
- Tian Fang Tower, Tianjin, China
- World Trade Center Competition
- World Trade Center Site Viewing Platform

== Competitions ==
- World Trade Center Competition, 2003 – ‘‘Finalist’’
- Robbins School Elementary School Competition, 2005 – ‘‘Finalist’’
- City Lights Competition NYC, 2005 – ‘‘Finalist’’
- The Martin Luther King Jr. Memorial Competition, 2000 – ‘‘2nd Place’’
- The Film House, The Architect’s Dream House Competition, 1995 – ‘‘1st Place’’
- The Foundations House, The Architect’s Dream House Competition, 1995 – ‘‘2nd Place’’

== Exhibitions ==
- ‘‘‘‘‘WTC/UA entry’’’’’, MoMA Permanent Collection
- ‘‘‘‘‘UA Exhibition’’’’’, Grimaldi Forum, Monaco, 2006
- ‘‘‘‘‘Tall Buildings’’’’’ Museum of Modern Art, New York, 2004
- ‘‘‘‘‘Beyond the Box’’’’’ The Municipal Society of New York, 1995
- ‘‘‘‘‘Architects Dream’’’’’ Center for Contemporary Architecture, Cincinnati, OH, 1995
- ‘‘‘‘‘On Hold’’’’’ Young Architects Annual Competition Exhibition, Architectural League of New York, 1992
- ‘‘‘‘‘New Schools for New York’’’’’ Architectural League of New York, 1992
- ‘‘‘‘‘Vacant Lots’’’’’ Architectural League of New York, 1990

== Awards ==
,

- ICSC Best of the Best VIVA Award – Bloomingdale's Santa Monica, 2013
- ICSC US Design Development Award – Bloomingdale's Santa Monica, 2012
- ICSC International Design & Development Award, 2008
- New York Chapter AIA Project Design Honor Award – The Incubator, 2006
- Robbins School Elementary Competition Finalist, 2005
- NYC City Lights Competition Finalist, 2005
- MoMA Permanent Collection – WTC/UA entry, 2003
- New York City Chapter AIA Design Award – The Rodin Museum, 2001
- New York City Chapter AIA Project Design Award – The Columbus Indiana Learning Center, 2001
- Jersey City Good Neighbor Award – Harborside Plaza Building 4A, 2001
- Construction News Award – 745 Seventh Avenue, 2001
- I.D. Magazine Award, Best of Category – Rodin Museum, 2000
- Saflex Safe and Sound Award – Rodin Museum, 1999
- New York State AIA Design Award – Rodin Museum, 1999
- American Architecture Award – Rodin Museum, 1999
- New York Chapter AIA Project Design Award – Rodin Museum, 1998
- New York State AIA Award – Bloomingdale’s Aventura, 1998
- Progressive Architecture Award – Rodin Museum, 1997
- New York City Chapter AIA Project Design Honor Award – The Film House, 1996
- New York City Chapter AIA Project Design Award – The Foundations House, 1996
- The Architect's Dream House Competition 1st Place – The Film House, 1995
- Young Architects Award from the Architectural League of New York, 1993
