= Rossana Hu =

Taiwanese-born architect (born 1968)

- Born: 1968 (age 57–58); Taiwan
- Education: University of California, Berkeley (BA, BS); Princeton University (MArch)
- Occupations: Interior designer, architect

Rossana Hu (born 1968), also known as Hu Rushan, is a Taiwanese architect and interior designer who works in China and was born and raised in Taiwan. Hu is a partner in Neri & Hu, a design and research organization in Shanghai founded in 2004.

== Early life and education ==
Hu was born and raised in Taiwan with her two siblings. She received her bachelors of arts in architecture and music from the University of California Berkeley going on to then study further at Princeton University achieving a master's degree in architecture and urban planning.

Prior to co-founding Neri & Hu, Hu was employed at various architecture companies such as a Ralph Lerner architect in Princeton, Michael Graves & Associates, Skidmore, Owings and Merrill in New York City.

In 2023, Hu was appointed as the Howard Friedman Visiting Professor at the University of California, Berkeley. Following her roles as a critic at the Harvard Graduate School of Design in 2021 and 2019, she was once again invited to serve as a critic there in 2023.In 2022 and 2018, Hu held positions at Yale School of Architecture as the Eero Saarinen Visiting Professor and the Norman Foster Visiting Professor, respectively. Hu has also taught and lectured at Columbia University Graduate School of Architecture, the Cooper Union for the Advancement of Science and Art, and Syracuse University School of Architecture as the Mark Robins Endowed Lecture.

In 2021 she became the chair of the architecture department at Shanghai’s Tongji University; Hu is the first woman to hold the position of chair and her appointment is the first time the position is held by someone who did not graduate from Tongji University.

== Selected works ==
Hu and Neri moved to Shanghai in 2002 and opened a showroom called Design Republic in 2004. They expanded to a third store in 2012 where they sell household furnishings that are modern, but get ideas from old Chinese objects. Their furniture is available in Vancouver, Canada.

In 2015, Hu became codirector of Stellar Works. Under the direction of Neri and Hu, Stellar Works products have won awards including Wallpaper* Smart Space Awards (2021), Best of Year by Interior Design magazine (2020), Archiproducts Awards (2018) and Wallpaper* Design Awards (2017).

Some notable buildings that Hu worked on include the Lantern Sulwhasoo, a Korean cosmetic store renovated by Hu. Hu designed the Fuzhou Teahouse, completed in 2021, and the Aranya Art Center in Shanghai.

== Personal life ==
Hu met her husband and partner Lyndon Neri while attending Berkeley.
