= Glendale Galleria =

Shopping mall in Glendale, California

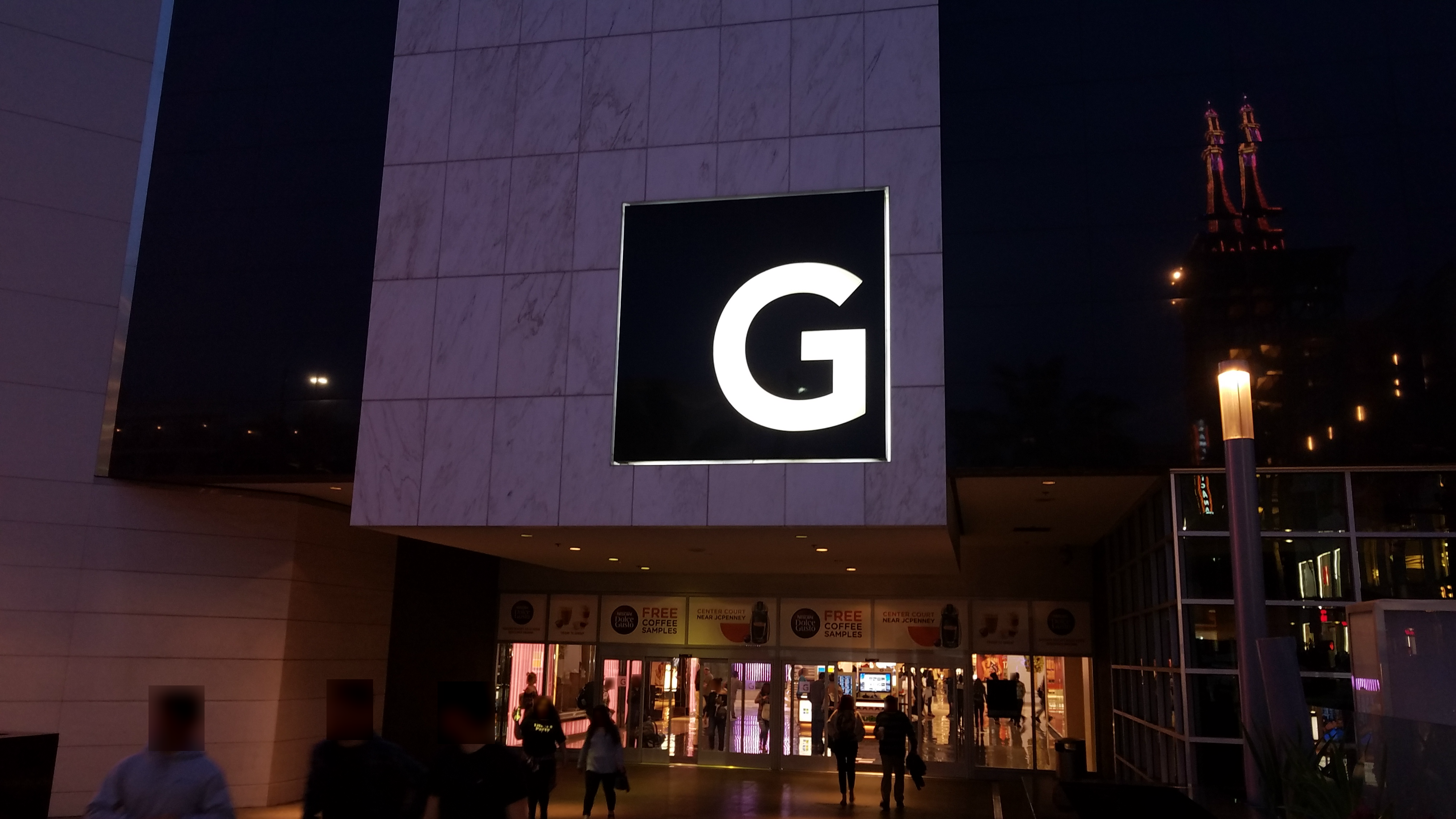
- Front entrance

General information
- Status: Completed
- Type: Shopping mall
- Location: Glendale, California, United States, 100 W Broadway Suite 700
- Coordinates: 34°8′45.22″N 118°15′29.82″W
- Construction started: 1973
- Estimated completion: 1976
- Opened: October 14, 1976; 50 years ago
- Renovated: 2012-2013
- Cost: US$75 million
- Renovation cost: US$57.5 million
- Owner: GGP

Technical details
- Material: Brick, marble, stone, aluminum, steel, granite, glass
- Floor count: 3
- Floor area: 1.6 million sq ft (150,000 m^{2})

Design and construction
- Architect: Jon Jerde
- Developer: Glendale Associates

Renovating team
- Architects: Kevin Kennon; SWA Group (Landscape Architect)
- Renovating firm: ELS Architecture; Kevin Kennon Architects
- Engineer: S.Y. Lee Associates (Consulting Engineers); AMEC E&I (Geotechnical)
- Structural engineer: KPFF Consulting Engineers
- Civil engineer: KPFF Consulting Engineers
- Other designers: RSM Design (Signage and Graphics); Horten Lees Brogden (Lighting)
- Main contractor: VCC Construction

Other information
- Number of stores: 200+
- Number of anchors: 6
- Parking: 2 parking decks, 6300+ spots total

Website
- glendalegalleria.com

The Glendale Galleria is a large three-story regional shopping center and office complex located in downtown Glendale, California, United States. Opened in 1976 with 1,600,000-square-foot (150,000 m^{2}) of retail space, it is the third-largest mall in Los Angeles County after Lakewood Center and Del Amo Fashion Center.

The mall is owned and managed by Brookfield Properties since 2002. It has been consistently ranked as one of the highest-grossing shopping centers in the United States.

The mall features the traditional retailers Target, Dick's Sporting Goods, JCPenney, Macy's, and Bloomingdale's.

== History ==
The Glendale Galleria was developed by Glendale Associates, a partnership between J.S. Griffiths Co, Broadway Hale Stores and M.J. Brock & Sons. Construction of the mall started in 1973 as agreements were negotiated with Glendale's Redevelopment Agency. The mall cost US$75 million. The architect was Jon Jerde, who credited his design to a Ray Bradbury essay on reviving retail districts. The first shops to open in the mall were the Buffums and The Broadway department stores, both in August 1976, a few months prior to the mall's formal opening. The Galleria officially opened on October 14, 1976. Ohrbach's and JCPenney opened locations in October and November 1976, respectively.

The Galleria's first expansion, Galleria II, was completed in 1983. It expanded a wing of the mall and added another anchor store, Nordstrom along with Mervyn's. The first Panda Express restaurant opened in Galleria II in the same year, on level 3 near Bloomingdale's.

The first Disney Store opened in the Glendale Galleria on March 28, 1987. By 1990, the mall was 1.6 million square feet (150,000 m^{2}) in size, and had annual revenues of $350 million. In 1990, the Buffums store closed, which was demolished and replaced by a three-story Robinsons-May store in 1993. In 1996, The Broadway closed, and was replaced by a Macy's.

Glendale Galleria was selected by Apple Inc. as the location of one of the first two Apple Stores in the world (along with Tysons Corner Center in McLean, Virginia); both officially opened on May 19, 2001.

On September 4, 2002, the Galleria's three owners at the time; J.S. Griffiths, Cigna, and the New York State Teachers' Retirement System, put the mall up for sale "for reasons unrelated to the mall's performance". On October 28, 2002, it was announced that General Growth Properties (now Brookfield Properties) would buy the Glendale Galleria for $415 million. The acquisition was completed on December 6, 2002.

The Galleria includes the world's first three-story Target store, which opened to the public on July 29, 2007 replacing the former Robinsons-May store, which closed in 2006. Mervyn's filed for bankruptcy and closed in 2009, and Bloomingdale's replaced it in 2013. In 2014, Nordstrom moved next door to the Americana, and in 2016, Dick's Sporting Goods reconstructed a portion of the previous Nordstrom. In 2019, Gold's Gym opened in the other half.

In 2016, it was reported that 30 million people have visited the Galleria throughout the year, making it one of the top 100 shopping centers according to Green Street Advisors. As of 2017, over 200 stores operate in the Galleria, with 6 of them acting as anchor stores.

== Architecture ==
Originally, the Galleria was covered in a windowless, unadorned brick finish. This type of architecture reflected the style of other shopping malls built across the country between the 1960s and 1970s.

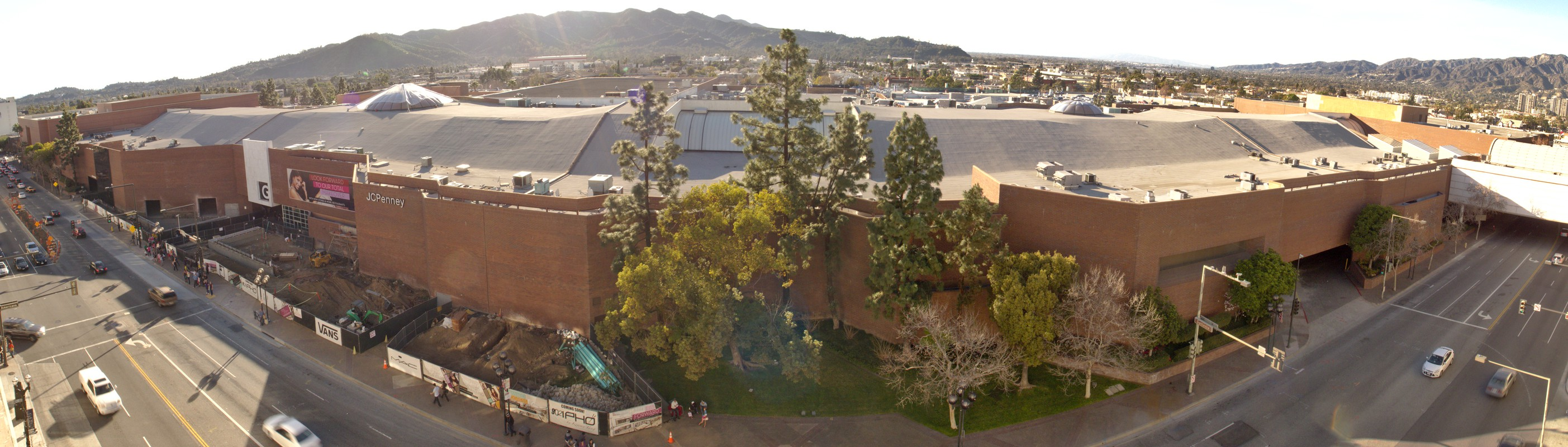
The Glendale Galleria, under renovation at the time, pictured from across S. Central Ave. looking westward

=== Renovation ===
Starting April 25, 2012, the Galleria underwent an extensive renovation. Designed by Kevin Kennon, objectives of the renovation included a modernized look, improved signage, and enhanced circulation and access. Various metal panels and meshes, most made out of white marble and black granite, were added to the building's facades. The renovation cost $57.5 million and was completed on November 9, 2013.

== In popular culture ==
In 2020, American pop singer Billie Eilish used Glendale Galleria as the setting for her "Therefore I Am" music video.

== See also ==
- Americana at Brand – Lifestyle center in Glendale, California
