= Arquitecturas Bis =

Architecture magazine in Spain (1974–1985)

- Editor-in-chief: Rosa Regàs
- Categories: Architecture magazine
- Frequency: Bimonthly
- Publisher: La Gaya Ciencia
- Founder: Rosa Regàs; Oriol Bohigas; Enric Satué
- Founded: 1974
- Final issue: 1985
- Country: Spain
- Based in: Barcelona
- Language: Spanish
- ISSN: 0213-1692

Arquitecturas Bis was a Spanish bimonthly architecture magazine which was published in Barcelona, Spain, between 1974 and 1985. Its subtitle was información gráfica de actualidad (Spanish: current graphic information).

== History and profile ==
Arquitecturas Bis was launched in Barcelona in 1974. The founders were writer Rosa Regàs, architect Oriol Bohigas and graphic designer Enric Satué. Regàs also served as the editor-in-chief and was the owner of La Gaya Ciencia, the publisher of the magazine. Arquitecturas Bis appeared on a bimonthly basis and had a layout of 230x395 mm.

The magazine editors were mostly Catalans who included Federico Correa, Lluís Domènech, Rafael Moneo, Helio Piñón, Manuel de Solà-Morales and Tomás Llorens. Luis Peña Ganchegui later became a member of the editorial board. In 1977 Fernando Villavecchia began to work for the magazine as the secretary of the editorial board. It contained news, notes, theoretical writings, historical essays, criticism and books reviews. Arquitecturas Bis focused on architecture-related topics, but also featured articles dealing with the question of aesthetic in a critical manner.

The magazine collaborated with Oppositions, a New York-based architecture magazine. The same writers published articles in both titles which frequently cited each other.

The magazine folded in 1985 after producing a total of 32 single and 10 doubles issues.
