= University of Kentucky College of Design =

Art school of the University of Kentucky

Located at the University of Kentucky in Lexington, the College of Design encompasses the School of Architecture, the School of Interior Design, and the Department of Historic Preservation.

== History ==
The School of Architecture is the oldest program in the college, with its origins in the 1920s as an architectural option in the College of Engineering. Professor Charles P. Graves joined the Civil Engineering faculty in 1958, charged with converting the architectural option to a professional degree program. The curriculum changed from a mathematical and applied science concentration to courses in the arts, science, humanities, architectural design, and history.

The School of Architecture was established in 1965 with Professor Graves as Dean. The school was located in Pence Hall, the former physics building on UK's campus. That year, the program also received its first accreditation from the National Architectural Accrediting Board (NAAB). The School became a college in 1967. By 1971, the college had grown to over four hundred students; to accommodate this growth, space in Miller Hall was given to the college and a selective admission policy was adopted.

In the early 1970s, Richard Rankin – the most noted interior design educator in the United States – was hired by the Dean of Home Economics to establish a professional degree in interior design. UK's professional program was put in place in 1975, with the first graduating class in 1979. The program was then able to go for accreditation, which was awarded in the spring of 1981 by the Foundation of Interior Design Education and Research (now the Council of Interior Design Accreditation or CIDA).

In 1994, the program for historic preservation was established in the School of Architecture, and the Master of Historic Preservation degree was first offered in 1996. In 2002, the School of Architecture merged with the School of Interiors and the Historic Preservation Program to become the College of Design. Additional space for the new programs was allocated to the college in Funkhouser Building and Bowman Hall.

In Fall 2020, the College of Design launched an undergraduate degree in product design — the first program of its kind in Kentucky.

In Spring 2022, the college announced plans for the renovation and revitalization of the Reynolds Building — a former tobacco warehouse — into a vibrant new space for the College of Design, thanks in large part to a transformative gift of $5.25 million from Gray, Inc. Construction on the Gray Design Building began in August 2022. In Spring 2024, the Gray Design Building was completed. Students, faculty and staff moved in over Spring Break, marking the first time that all programs in the College of Design were housed in the same building. The official ribbon-cutting for the building was held in September 2024. Also, the Department of Product Design graduated its first undergraduate class in Spring 2024.

The College of Design is currently home to over 500 students, offering undergraduate degrees in Architecture, Interiors and Product Design; graduate degrees in Architecture, Historic Preservation and Interiors; and certificates in Design-Build, Historic Preservation and Urban & Environmental Design.

== Deans ==
Chuck Graves was the first Dean of the College of Architecture, serving from 1965 until 1971. In 1971, Professor Graves resigned, and Professor Anthony Eardley became the second Dean in 1972. Prior to coming to UK, Dean Eardley served as a professor at the Architectural Association, London, England; Princeton; and The Cooper Union. In 1986, Professor Jose’ R. Oubrerie became the third Dean. Dean Oubrerie previously worked as an associate of Le Corbusier and as a professor at Columbia University. David Mohney was Dean of the College of Architecture from 1994 to 2002, then Dean of the College of Design from 2002 to 2007. In 2007, David Biagi was appointed as the Interim Dean for the college. In 2008, Michael Speaks became the first appointed Dean for the College of Design. Dean Speaks is former director of the Graduate Program and founding director of the Metropolitan Research and Design Postgraduate Program at the Southern California Institute of Architecture. Ann Whiteside-Dickson, former director of the University of Kentucky School of Interior Design, served as interim dean until 2015. In 2015, Mitzi Vernon became Dean of the College of Design. In Fall 2022, Ned Crankshaw became the Acting Dean of the College of Design. He was appointed as Dean in July 2024.

== Notable graduates ==
Graduates have worked in the offices of Morphosis, Daniel Libeskind, SHoP Architects, Rem Koolhaas (OMA), REX, Reiser + Umemoto, Hardy Holzman Pfeiffer Associates, Leonardo Ricci, and other leading architects.
