= Anthony Vidler =

British architectural historian (1941–2023)

- Born: 4 July 1941; Mere, Wiltshire, England
- Died: 19 October 2023 (aged 82); New York City, U.S.
- Occupation: Architectural historian
- Spouse: Emily Apter (m. 1984)
- Children: 3

Academic background
- Education: Emmanuel College, Cambridge (BA, Dipl.Arch); Technical University Delft (PhD)

Anthony Vidler (4 July 1941 – 19 October 2023) was an English architectural historian and critic. He was Professor at the Irwin S. Chanin School of Architecture at The Cooper Union.

== Life and career ==
Vidler was born in Mere, Wiltshire, in 1941, and grew up in Shenfield, Essex. His interest in architecture and its sociopolitical relevance began when he saw an air raid on a neighbouring town during World War II. He received a B.A. and Dipl.Arch. from Emmanuel College, Cambridge and a Ph.D. from Technical University Delft.

Vidler began his career at Princeton University in 1965, before moving to the University of California, Los Angeles in 1993. He was the dean of Cornell University's architecture school from 1997 to 1998, and of The Cooper Union's architecture school from 2001 to 2013. Afterward, he taught at Princeton, Brown University and Yale University. He was a noted expert on the life and work of Claude-Nicolas Ledoux, about whom he wrote several books.

After a previous marriage ended in divorce, Vidler married fellow historian Emily Apter in 1984. He had two children from his first marriage and one from his second.

Vidler died from non-Hodgkin lymphoma at his home in Manhattan on 19 October 2023, at the age of 82.

== Curatorial work ==
Vidler curated several exhibitions, including the part of the exhibition out of the box: price rossi stirling + matta-clark dedicated to James Stirling at the Canadian Centre for Architecture (2003-2004) and the exhibition Notes from the Archive: James Frazer Stirling which travelled to the Yale Center for British Art, the Tate, the Staatsgalerie Stuttgart, and the Canadian Centre for Architecture (2010-2012).

== Publications ==
- The Writing of the Walls. Architectural Theory in the Late Enlightenment (Princeton: Princeton Architectural Press, 1987). Paperback, 1990.
- Ledoux (Paris: Editions Hazan, 1987). Foreign editions: Berlin, 1989, Tokyo, 1989, Madrid, 1994.
- Claude-Nicolas Ledoux: Architecture and Social Reform at the End of the Ancien Régime (Cambridge, Mass.: MIT Press, 1990).
- The Architectural Uncanny: Essays in the Modern Unhomely (Cambridge, Mass.: MIT Press, 1992).
- L'Espace des Lumières: Architecture et philosophie de Ledoux à Fourier (Paris: Editions Picard, 1992). Translation and revised edition of The Writing of the Walls with new introduction and concluding chapter, 1992. Spanish edition: El espacio de la Ilustración. La teoria arquitectónica en Francia a finales del siglo XVIII, trans. Jorge Sainz (Madrid: Alianza Editorial, 1997).
- Antoine Grumbach (Paris: Centre Georges Pompidou, 1996).
- Warped Space: Art, Architecture, and Anxiety in Modern Culture (Cambridge, Mass.: MIT Press, 2000).
- Claude-Nicolas Ledoux (Paris: Hazan, 2005).
- Claude-Nicolas Ledoux: Architecture and Utopia in the Age of the French Revolution (Basel: Birkhäuser, 2006).
- Histories of the Immediate Present. Inventing Architectural Modernism (Cambridge, Mass.: MIT Press, 2008).
- Architecture Between Spectacle and Use, ed. Anthony Vidler, Clark Studies in the Visual Arts (New Haven and London: Yale University Press, 2008), “Introduction,” pp.vii-xiii; “Architecture's Expanded Field,” pp. 143–154.
- James Frazer Stirling: Notes from the Archive (New Haven and London: The Yale Center for British Art and Yale University Press; Montreal: Canadian Centre for Architecture, 2010).
- The Scenes of the Street and Other Essays (New York: The Monacelli Press, 2011).

== Awards ==
Vidler was awarded fellowships with the Institute for Architecture and Urban Studies (1971–84), the New York Institute for the Humanities at New York University (1980–82), the John Simon Guggenheim Memorial Foundation (1985-86), the National Endowment for the Humanities (1989–90), the American Academy of Arts and Sciences (1995-20??), and the Canadian Centre for Architecture in Montreal (2005).
