= Emily Apter =

American academic, translator, and editor (born 1954)

Emily Susan Apter (born 1954) is an American academic, translator, editor and professor. Her areas of research are translation theory, language philosophy, political theory, critical theory, continental philosophy, history and theory of comparative literature, psychoanalysis, and political fiction. She is currently Silver Professor of French and Comparative Literature and Chair of the Department of French Literature, Thought and Culture at New York University.

== Life and career ==
Emily Apter is the daughter of the Yale political scientist David E. Apter. Apter was married to the architectural historian Anthony Vidler, who died in October 2023. She completed her BA at Harvard University and earned her MA and her PhD at Princeton University on Comparative Literature, with focus on 19th and 20th-century French, British and German literature, theory, and history of literary criticism. Between 1993 and 2002 she taught at the University of California, Los Angeles, and at Cornell University. Since 2002, she is Silver Professor of French and Comparative Literature at New York University. She was appointed president of the American Comparative Literature Association for the years 2017–2018.

Apter is the editor of the book series Translation/Transnation from Princeton University Press, a series that approaches the literary dimension of transnationalism and puts special emphasis on the politics of language, accent, and comparative literature movements.

Emily Apter is a contributor to the recent debate about world literature theory.

She is currently working on her next book Translating in-Equality: Equivalence, Justness, Rightness, Equaliberty.

== Affiliations and honours (selected) ==
- (2022) GRI Fellowship (NYU-Paris)
- (2019) Daimler Fellowship
- (2017–18) President of the American Comparative Literature Association
- (2016) Vice President of the American Comparative Literature Association
- (2015) Executive Council of the Modern Language Association
- (2014) Humanities Council Fellow at Princeton University
- (2010–12) Mellon Grant (with Jacques Lezra)
- (2010) Member of the advisory board of the Institute of World Literature, Harvard University
- (2004) Guggenheim Fellowship for Humanities
- (2001) Rockefeller Fellowship
- (1998–1999) Editorial board member of the Publications of the Modern Language Association of America (PMLA)
- (1991) Grant from College Art Association
- Member of the Signet Society, Harvard University
- Member of the Semiotic Society of America
- Member of the Pi Delta Phi (National French Honors Society)

== Publications ==
=== Books authored ===
- (2017) Unexceptional Politics: On Obstruction, Impasse and the Impolitic

Unexceptional Politics, unlike her earlier works, distances itself from translation, and focuses on the language and lexicon used to talk about politics. This book has been described as a work of political philology, where she makes vast use of neologisms and alters the meaning of other terms by setting them in a whole different context. She talks about "small-p politics": "this micro, unexceptional politics is often barely perceptible, but it is there nonetheless" and it is what helps shape Politics with "capital p".

- (2013) Against World Literature: On the politics of untranslatability

Against World Literature challenges a concept of World Literature that relies on a translatability assumption. It focuses on topics like world literature, comparative literature, and translation studies. Apter finds it essential to pay the necessary attention to untranslatability and she argues that translation is no substitute for the original. The problems and failures in translation are unavoidable and part of the process and result in what she calls the "Untranslatables".

- (2006) The Translation Zone: A New Comparative Literature

In The Translation Zone, Apter argues how translation plays an essential role in the redefinition and establishment of a new comparative literature. The book also focuses, among other topics, on the rapid development of translation technologies and its effect on translation itself, the "language wars", and the tensions between cultural translation and textual translation.

- (1999) Continental Drift: From National Characters to Virtual Subjects

Continental Drift focuses on the French colonial and postcolonial experience, together with the fate of national literatures in an increasingly globalised world. Apter explores continental theory in a global frame, and "the dissolution of a national subject." She dives in debates of postcolonial studies, gender, identity and cultural studies.

- (1991) Feminizing the Fetish: Psychoanalysis and Narrative Obsession in Turn-of-the-Century France

Feminizing the fetish is an analysis of fetishism in turn-of-the-century French culture, with special emphasis on female fetishism. In an interdisciplinary approach, Apter explores the topic of fetishism and perversion through a narratological, New Historical, hermeneutical, feminist, and psychoanalytical lens.

- (1987) André Gide and the Codes of Homotextuality

In this work, Apter develops her thesis within the frame of poststructuralism. She focuses on sexual identity, the consciousness of language from the perspective of modern linguistic theory. She analyses Gide's use of rhetorical devices and discusses the famous "mise en abyme".

=== Books edited ===
- (2022) Gayatri Chakravorty Spivak, Living Translation (co-edited with Avishek Ganguly and Mauro Pala)
- (2015) Dictionary of Untranslatables: A Philosophical Lexicon (Co-edited with Jacques Lezra and Michael Wood of the English edition of the Vocabulaire européen des philosophies: Dictionnaire des intraduisibles ed. Barbara Cassin)
- (2001) Translation in a Global Market
- (1996) Fetishism as cultural discourse

=== Articles (selected) ===
- (2022) “Tasks of the Spivakian Translator” in Journal of Comparative Literature and Aesthetics.
- (2021) “What Is Just Translation?” in Public Culture.
- (2019) “Justifying the Humanities,” in Comparative Literature.
- (2019) “Untranslatability and the Geopolitics of Reading,” in PMLA : Publications of the Modern Language Association of America.
- (2016) “Shibboleth: Policing by Ear and Forensic Listening in Projects by Lawrence Abu Hamdan,” in October.
- (2016) “Le comparatisme comme approche critique/Comparative Literature as a Critical Approach,” in Rencontres – Littérature générale et comparée.
- (2015) “Lexilalia: On Translating an Untranslatable Dictionary of Philosophical Terms,” in Paragraph.
- (2014) “Fictions politiques/démarches impolitiques,” in Raison Publique.
- (2012) “Towards a Unisex Erotics: Claude Cahun and Geometric Modernism,” in Modernist Eroticisms: European Literature After Sexology.
- (2008) “Untranslatables: A World System,” in New Literary History.
- (2003) “Global Translatio: The "invention" of Comparative Literature, Istanbul, 1933.” Critical Inquiry.
- (2002) “Warped Speech: The Politics of Global Translation,” in Beyond Dichotomies: Histories, Identities, Cultures and the Challenge of Globalization.
- (2001) “Balkan Babel: Translation Zones, Military Zones,” in Public Culture.
- (1997) “Out of Character: Camus's French Algerian Subjects,” in special issue of Modern Language Notes.
