= Diana Agrest =

American architect

Diana I. Agrest (born 1945) is a practicing architect and urban designer and an architecture and urban design theorist, in New York City.

From the beginning of her career, while still a student, she started developing critical work on urban discourse as a result of the inefficiency of the existing urban design theories and models, and her need to find alternative ways to think about the city in relation to her practice. As a result, she developed critical work, both in theory and practice alternatively. She was on the forefront of a poststructuralist approach as a tool for critically re-thinking architecture, and particularly the city and Urbanism.

== Academic ==
Agrest is a tenured professor of architecture at the Irwin S. Chanin School of Architecture of the Cooper Union.

She was a full-time lecturer at Princeton University School of Architecture starting in 1972-1973, and was the first woman architect to teach at the university. She taught both design studio and theory including the influential course "The Theoretical Practice of Architecture". In 1972 she became a fellow of The Institute for Architecture and Urban Studies in New York, where she remained a fellow until 1984. At the IAUS she did research on the concept of 'place' from a semiotic perspective, funded by the National Institute of Mental Health and taught at the undergraduate program in architectural education, where she was in charge of the pedagogical orientation of the design studios. She later became the director of the Advanced Workshop in Architecture and Urban Form. In 1977 she was offered a teaching position by John Hejduk, dean of the school of architecture at the Cooper Union. Between 1987 and 1994 she divided her teaching between Cooper Union and Columbia University. She has also taught as a guest professor at Yale University, Princeton University and Paris 8 University.

== Practice ==
Agrest started her practice very early on, after her studies in Paris doing experimental and theoretical projects and competitions from 1969 to 1977. In 1978, Diana Agrest co-founded Agrest and Gandelsonas, and in 1980 Agrest and Gandelsonas Architects in New York. As an architect and urbanist she has been involved in the design and building of projects, with her firm in the US, Asia, Europe and South America, ranging from urban design projects and master plans, institutional and residential buildings to single family houses and interiors that have been received numerous awards. Her work focuses on urban projects at various scales and the city informs her smaller scale architecture. Recent projects and buildings include John and Mary Pappajohn Sculpture Park, Des Moines, Iowa; Des Moines Vision Plan, second Phase; Green Belt, South Amboy, NJ; International Film Center, Shanghai, China; Master Plan and Urban Design for 5 Sq. Miles in Xu Jia Hui, Shanghai, China; Manhattan West, Master Plan for West Side of Manhattan; Master Plan for the Renault Trapeze Site in Boulogne Billancourt, France. Buildings include Private residence in the West Hollywood Hills; Breukelen Community Center, Brooklyn, New York; Melrose Community Center; Farm Complex in Jose Ignacio, Uruguay; Farm Complex, Renovation and Additions, Sagaponack, New York, etc. She is a Fellow of the American Institute of Architects. She has also developed a number of theoretical projects on her own, such as Les Echelles, a house for a musician in Majorca, Spain; Park Square, Boston; the China Basin project in San Francisco, for SFMOMA.

Nature Since 1989, she has been working on the subject of nature and urban discourse starting with her visionary project for China Basin which was ahead of its time in proposing a critical exploration of the relationship between nature and urbanism dispensing with buildings, being a pioneer in what became later called "landscape urbanism". Out of this project she wrote the theoretical essay "The Return of the Repressed: Nature". She has since worked on the subject of Nature itself, in writing and teaching and developing since 2009 an advanced research studio which she directs in the MArch II Program at Cooper Union.

Film Agrest has had a longstanding passion for film and developed an approach to urban architecture based in great part on film and film theory. She was the first to bring this subject to the fore in architecture as a critical theoretical subject. This work was originally presented as "Design Vs Non-Design: A Problem in the Re-definition of Architecture" at Berkeley in 1973. This was later published as "Design Vs Non Design" in Oppositions 6, 1976. Film and the city has been the subject of a number of essays as well as an important tool in her pedagogical approach. Based on her theoretical work on the subject, she was approached in 1993 to create a program at The Whitney Museum of American Art, sponsored by the Whitney Museum of American Art, the Rockefeller Foundation and New York University on film and the city. As a result, she created and directed "Framing the City: Film, Video, Urban Architecture", where she developed an approach to Urban Architecture whereby film is used in its relation to the city by producing "filmic readings" of the city, as a point of departure for the production of urban form. She has applied this approach to her Design Studios, thus expanding the way of approaching urban design practice and theory.

As a filmmaker she has written, produced and directed the documentary film "THE MAKING OF AN AVANT-GARDE©: The Institute for Architecture and Urban Studies 1967–1984", which has had its Premiere at The Museum of Modern Art in NY in 2013 and has since been screened at a number of Museums, universities and festivals.

== Bibliography ==
Books by Diana Agrest:

- Agrest and Gandelsonas, Works Princeton Architectural Press, 1995
- Architecture from Without: Theoretical Framings for a Critical Practice, MIT Press, 1991, published in Japanese by the Kajima Institute)
- Architecture of Nature, Applied Research & Design, 2019
- Monuments and Places; The Photographic work of Roberto Schezen, Rizzolii, 19
- Practice: Architecture, Technique and Representation- Essays, The Gordon and Breach Publishing Company, 2000
- A Romance with the City: The Work of Irwin S. Chanin, The Cooper Union, 1982.
- The Sex of Architecture, Ed. Agrest/Conway/Weisman, Harry N. Abrams, 1996. Winner of the AIA International Book Award.

Her work and essays are featured in books and encyclopedias including:

- Modern Architecture A-Z, Peter Gössel, Benedikt Taschen GmbH, 2007
- New York 2000:Architecture and Urbanism from the Bicentennial to the Millennium, Stern, Fishman, Tilove, The Monacelli Press, 2007
- A Guide To Contemporary Architecture In America Vol 2. Toto, Tokyo, 2006
- Informal City, Kristin Freireiss, Prestel, 2005
- Chinese Architecture Highlights, 2005
- Encyclopedia of Twentieth Century Architecture, Ed. Routledge, New York, 2003.
- Encyclopedie de l'Architecture du XX Siecle, Hazan, Paris, 2003
- Beach Houses, Roberto Schezen, Michael Webb, harperCollins, 2002
- New York Architects, Allan Balfour, Willey and Son, 2002
- 1000 New York Buildings, Ed. Bill Harris, Jorg Brockmann, Judith Dupre, Black Dog & Leventhal Publishers, 2002.
- World Cities New York, Alan Balfour, Academy Editions, UK, 2001
- Architects on Architects, Ed. Susan Grey, Wiley and Sons, 2001.
- AIA Guide to New York City, Norval White, Elliot Willensky, Three Rivers Press, 2000.-Practice, Architecture, Technique, and Representation, ed. by Stan Allen, G+B International Publishing Group, Newark, NJ, 1999.
- American Architecture 2, Ed. P. Jodidio, Taschen 1998.
- Dictionnaire Encyclopedie de l' Architecture du XX Siecle, Hazan editeur, Paris, 1998
- Oppositions Reader, Ed. K. Michael Hayes, Princeton Architectural Press, 1998.
- Architecture Theory Since 1968, Ed. by K. Michael Hays, MIT Press, 1998.
- Not Architecture but Evidence that it Exists: Lauretta Vinciarelli's Watercolors, Brooke Hodge, Princeton Architectural Press, New York, 1999
- The Architect: Redefining her Practice, Ed. Francesca Hughes, MIT Press 1996.
- New American Houses, Ed. Mateo Vercelloni, Edizioni L'Arcivolto, 1997
- Contemporary American Architects, Volume II, Benedikt Taschen Verlag GmbH, Spring 1996

Her firm's works as well as her own theoretical projects have been the subject of numerous essays. Both her work and writings have been widely published nationally and internationally in journals and newspapers.

== Honors and awards ==
Her work has received numerous awards including, Excellence in Design Awards from the New York State AIA, Excellence in Design Awards from the New York City Chapter AIA. The Masterwork Award from the Municipal Art Society for the best Building in New York City and the Society of Registered Architects NY Chapter Award of Merit. In 2008 she was advanced to Fellow of the American Institute of Architects.

She has received grants twice from the Graham Foundation in 2004 and 2009, was awarded grants twice by the New York State Council on the Arts in 2005 and 2009, and the AIA Brunner Grant in 2006 as well as twice funds from private donors for her documentary film The Making of an Avant-Garde: The Institute for Architecture and Urban Studies, 1967–84. She received the AIA International Book Award for The Sex of Architecture in 1996. She was nominated: for the Chrysler Award in 2001, 1999, 1997 and by the American Academy of Arts and Letters 1993, 1992, 1991. She has also received a Fellowship from the French Government in 1967 to study in Paris.

In 2014, Agrest was recognized for her work designing the Melrose Community Center, a winning site of Built by Women New York City, a competition launched by the Beverly Willis Architecture Foundation during the fall of 2014 to identify outstanding and diverse sites and spaces designed, engineered and built by women.

== Exhibitions ==
Her work has been exhibited in museums, galleries, and universities throughout the United States and abroad including: The Museum of Contemporary Art, Los Angeles; The Walker Art Center, Minneapolis; The Dallas Museum of Contemporary Art; The Fogg Museum, Harvard; Leo Castelli Gallery, New York; Centre Pompidou, Paris; Triennale di Milano; Frankfurt Architecture Museum, West Germany, San Francisco. Museum of Modern Art, The Architectural League, NY, Yale University School of Architecture Gallery, Cooper Union, etc. She has also lectured extensively and participated and been the keynote speaker in conferences and symposiums in North, Central and South America, Europe, Asia and Australia.

== Biographical information ==
Agrest is an American citizen, born in Buenos Aires, Argentina, in 1945 where she started her studies in the field of architecture at the age of 16 and received her Diploma Architect from the Faculty of Architecture and Urbanism, University of Buenos Aires in 1967. She left Argentina upon graduation, having been awarded a fellowship from the French government, and did post-graduate work at the Ecole Pratique des Hautes Etudes VI Section, Paris and at the Centre de Recherche d'Urbanisme in Paris from 1967 to 1969. She subsequently came to New York to the Institute for Architecture and Urban Studies in 1971.
