= Ralph Lerner (architect) =

American architect

3rd Dean of Princeton University School of Architecture
- In office 1989–2002
- Preceded by: Robert Maxwell
- Succeeded by: Stan Allen

Personal details
- Born: 1949 New York, New York
- Died: May 7, 2011 (aged 61–62) Princeton, New Jersey
- Education: Cooper Union; Harvard University (MArch)

Ralph Lerner (1949 – May 7, 2011) was an American architect, born in New York in 1949. He studied under John Hejduk at Cooper Union. Lerner then worked for Ulrich Franzen and Richard Meier. Lerner obtained a master's degree in architecture at Harvard University in 1975, and joined the University of Virginia faculty.

While based in Charlottesville, Lerner led his own firm, Ralph Lerner, Architecture and Urban Design. From 1979 to 1980, Lerner taught at Polytechnic of Central London. He returned to the United States for a position at Harvard, then accepted an associate professorship at Princeton University in 1983. Ralph Lerner Architect PC was established in Princeton the following year. He was appointed dean of the Princeton University School of Architecture in 1989, two years after becoming a full professor. Lerner was designated George Dutton ’27 Professor of Architecture in 1994, and was succeeded as dean by Stan Allen in 2002. Lerner remained on the Princeton faculty until his 2008 resignation, to assume the deanship of the Faculty of Architecture at the University of Hong Kong.

Lerner resigned from HKU in April 2011 for health reasons, and returned to the United States. He died in Princeton, New Jersey, of brain cancer on May 7, 2011, aged 61.
