= Institute for Architecture and Urban Studies =

Architecture school in New York, United States

Coordinates: 40°43′38.41″N 74°0′19.21″W

The Institute for Architecture & Urban Studies (IAUS)
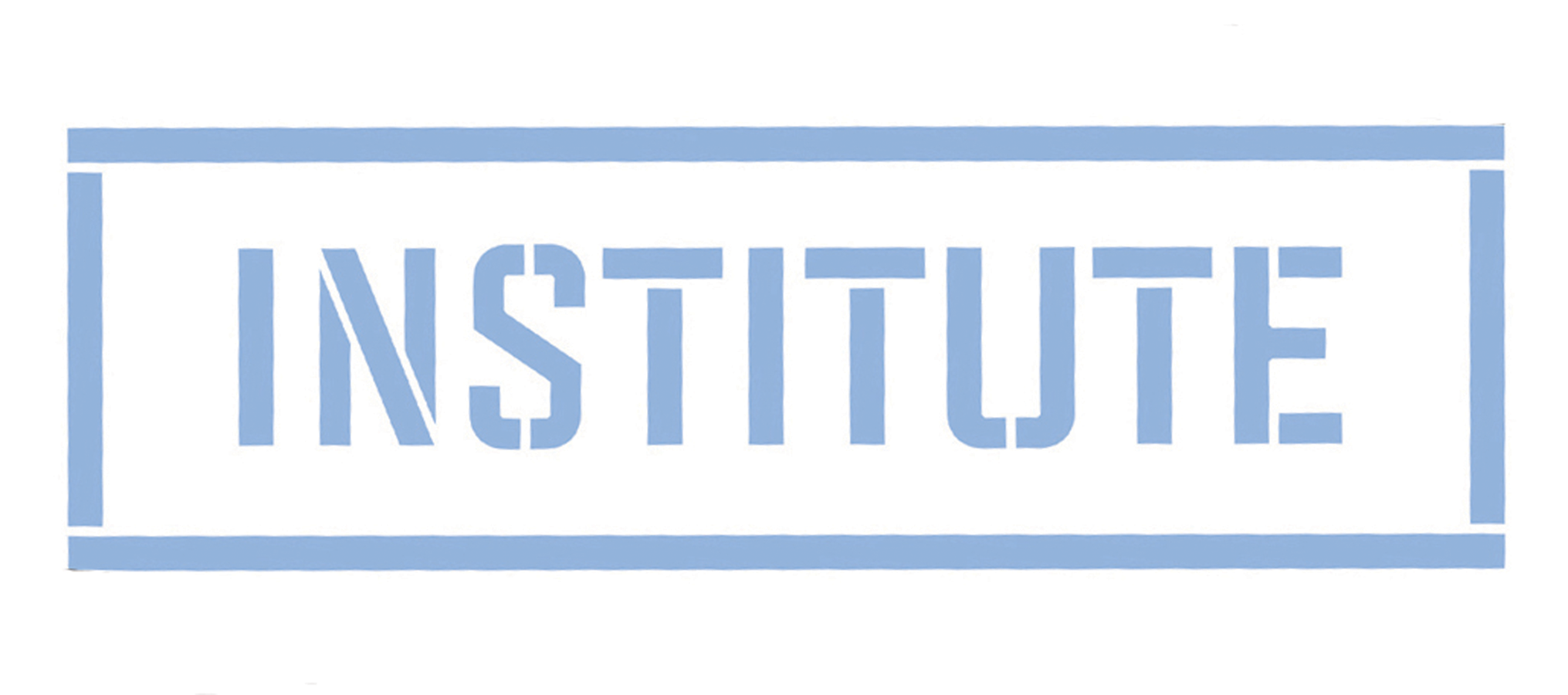
- New York, New York; United States

Information
- Type: Concentrated Individualized Architecture Studio
- Motto: Learn Architecture
- Board of Directors: Bruce Becker, Kevin Kennon & Greg Lynn

The Institute for Architecture & Urban Studies is a non-profit architecture studio and think tank located in Manhattan, New York, United States. The original Institute existed from 1967 to 1984, where it was a hub for experimental architectural discourse and practice. It re-opened in 2003 as a non-profit offering individualized summer architecture studios.

== IAUS (1967–1984) ==
The Institute of Architecture and Urban Studies was founded in 1967 as a non-profit independent agency concerned with research, education, and development in architecture and urbanism. It began as a core group of young architects seeking alternatives to traditional forms of education and practice.

The IAUS developed its curriculum in collaboration with a group of liberal arts colleges and universities and began its undergraduate education program in 1973. The program was open to students from a consortium of liberal arts colleges and provided an architectural component as a supplement to traditional liberal arts studies. Twelve students from five colleges (Oberlin, Wesleyan, Hampshire, Smith, Sarah Lawrence) participated in the institute's first academic year (1974–75), increasing to 35 students from sixteen colleges by 1978.

The program was organized around a rigorous sequence in the history and theory of architecture and an intensive design tutorial taught by the institute's fellows. The IAUS was not accredited by the National Architectural Accrediting Board nor another accrediting board and thus could not grant degrees.

In 1977, design/study options gave students enrolled in a six-year professional degree program the opportunity to participate in the academic program. Credit for the program was provided by the student's own institution.

Peter Eisenman was appointed as IAUS's first executive director followed by Anthony Vidler (1982), Mario Gandelsonas (1983), and Stephen Peterson (1984). In 1985, IAUS ceased to exist.

== The current institute (2003–present) ==
The Institute for Architecture and Urban Studies re-opened in 2003 due in a large part in the 9/11 renewal awareness in the critical impact of built form—how it is experienced, mediated, remembered and imaged—on our daily lives. The new Institute purports that this new awakening in the power and role of architecture exposed a need for an independent, multidisciplinary think-tank, or pedagogical “free speech zone”, in which to question, provoke, debate, experiment, explore and rethink the future of the metropolis at all scales.

=== Mission statement ===
The new institute's goal is to keep alive the improvisational spirit that made the old Institute at its apogee a mecca for young architects and critics like Peter Eisenman, Rem Koolhaas, Aldo Rossi, Charles Gwathmey, Frank Gehry, Diana Agrest, Rafael Moneo, Robert Stern, Bernard Tschumi, Michael Graves, Richard Meier, Kenneth Frampton, Manfredo Tafuri, Gandelsonas, and Vidler, among others. While the original institute helped shape much of the autonomous theoretical discourse that dominated architectural culture in the last 30 years of the 20th century, the new institute concentrates more on applied theory and research utilizing new technology, cross-disciplines, materials and methods.

While there are other architecture organizations in New York they are primarily places for exhibitions and lectures. They provided little in the way of debate, criticism, multidisciplinary experimentation, progressive education, improvisation and applied theory. While schools of architecture like Columbia University, Cooper Union, and Pratt Institute have better success at creating greater intellectual friction and stimulation than the above-mentioned private organizations, they are to a great degree hampered by the requirements of professional accreditation.

=== Affiliations ===
- Hampshire College
- Mt. Holyoke College
- NYU | Gallatin School of Individualized Study
- Amherst College
