= Wenzhou–Kean University =

Joint-venture university in Wenzhou, Zhejiang, China and Kean in New Jersey, US

Coordinates: 27.91613°N 120.65477°E

- 温州肯恩大学
- Type: Private university
- Established: 2014; 12 years ago
- Location: Wenzhou, Zhejiang, China
- Website: wku.edu.cn/en/

Chinese name
- Simplified Chinese: 温州肯恩大学
- Traditional Chinese: 溫州肯恩大學
Transcriptions
Standard Mandarin
- Hanyu Pinyin: Wēnzhōu Kěnēn Dàxué

Wenzhou–Kean University (WKU) is a Sino-foreign cooperative university in Wenzhou, Zhejiang, China. It was established in 2014 by a partnership between Wenzhou University and the Kean University of New Jersey.

== History ==
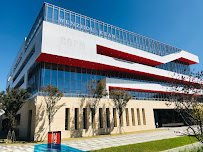
Wenzhou–Kean University

In March 2014, the Ministry of Education of China approved the establishment of Wenzhou–Kean University. The university received its accreditation to confer bachelor's degrees in 2018 and to confer professional master's degrees in 2019.

=== Construction ===
The construction project and all costs of operating Wenzhou–Kean University will be paid for through tuition and financing provided by the municipal and provincial governments in China. There will be no cost to Kean University or the state of New Jersey. The partnership will be with Wenzhou University, an institution in Zhejiang Province, which will bear the entire cost, estimated to exceed $60 million. This funding will cover the construction of the planned 300-acre campus, as well as all faculty expenses and the daily operational costs of the school.

== Controversies ==
A 2015 NJ.com article stated that job postings of the university allegedly favored Chinese Communist Party (CCP) affiliates for non-faculty roles.

A November 2018 NJ.com article stated that, faculty and staff at Wenzhou–Kean University would be employed as personnel at the branch campus and their salaries would be paid in Chinese yuan. Randi Weingarten, head of the American Federation of Teachers, criticized Kean University for "not [respecting] American values, the values of justice, the values of free expression, the values of opportunity". Kean University responded that Weingarten used an appeal to xenophobia, that these changes would have little impact on faculty and staff, and that the university's human resources management practices were consistent with other United States universities with branch campuses in China.

In July 2026, Inside Higher Ed reported that current and former faculty accused the university of unclear employment agreements, wrongful termination, discrimination, retaliation, and a lack of shared governance. The report described faculty uncertainty over whether they were employed by Kean University or Wenzhou–Kean, and stated that professors over the age of 60 who did not qualify as "Category A" talent faced non-renewal following a change in Chinese work-permit rules, with some faculty over retirement age placed on service contracts that do not carry mandatory severance. A Kean spokesperson called the institution "an extraordinary Sino-American educational partnership" and stated that the university appoints faculty using the same process regardless of age.
