= Nicor Gas =

Energy company

- Type: Subsidiary
- Industry: Gas utilities
- Founded: 1953; 73 years ago
- Headquarters: Naperville, Illinois, United States
- Owner: Southern Company
- Website: www.nicorgas.com

Previous logo

Nicor Gas is an energy company headquartered in Naperville, Illinois. Its largest subsidiary, Nicor Gas, is a natural gas distribution company. Founded in 1954, the company serves more than two million customers in a service territory that encompasses most of the northern third of Illinois, excluding the city of Chicago. Nicor Gas has 34,000 miles (55,000 km) of pipelines.

AGL Resources announced its acquisition of Nicor in December 2010; the acquisition closed the following year. Southern Company announced its acquisition of AGL in 2016.

== See also ==
- Fixed bill

== External links and sources ==
- Nicor Gas website
- "Retail Unbundling - Illinois". Energy Information Administration.

Nicor Gas Login
