= Union Building, Shanghai =

Building on the Bund in Shanghai, China

Union Building
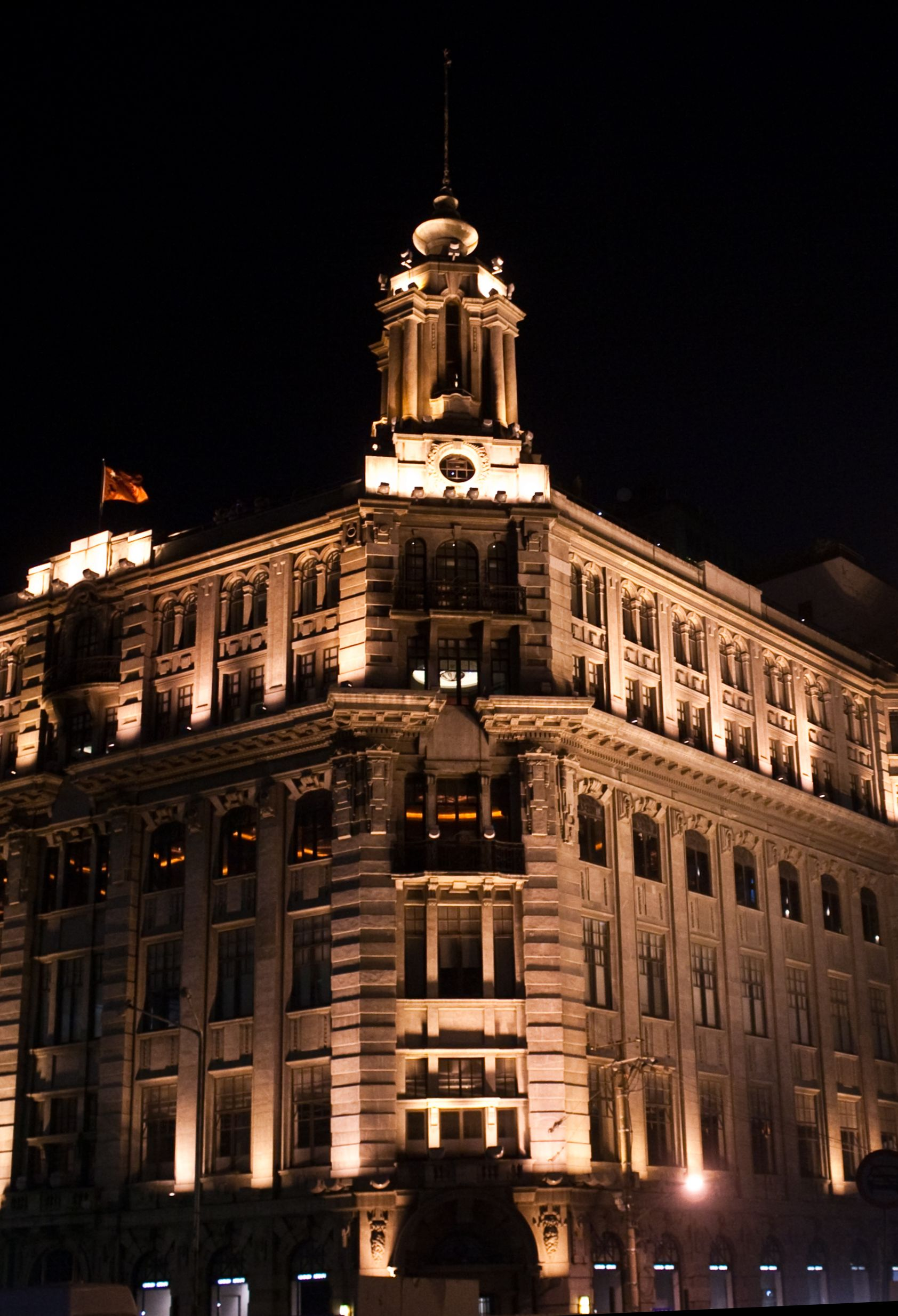
- No. 3 The Bund, at night
- Interactive map of the Union Building area

General information
- Architectural style: Neo-Renaissance
- Location: Shanghai, China, 3, The Bund
- Coordinates: 31.2361°N 121.4865°E
- Completed: 1916
- Renovated: 2006

Technical details
- Floor count: 6

Design and construction
- Architecture firm: P&T Architects and Surveyors

Website
- threeonthebund.com

The Union Building is a building on the Bund in Shanghai, China. It is located at No. 3, the Bund (formerly no. 4).

Completed in 1916, the building was used by a number of insurance companies. The six-storey building was the first work in Shanghai of P&T Architects and Surveyors (Palmer & Turner), and was the first building in Shanghai to use a steel structure. The building occupied 2241 square metres, with a floor area of 13760 square metres. Because it had a narrow frontage onto the Bund, the main door was located on the adjacent Guangdong Road.

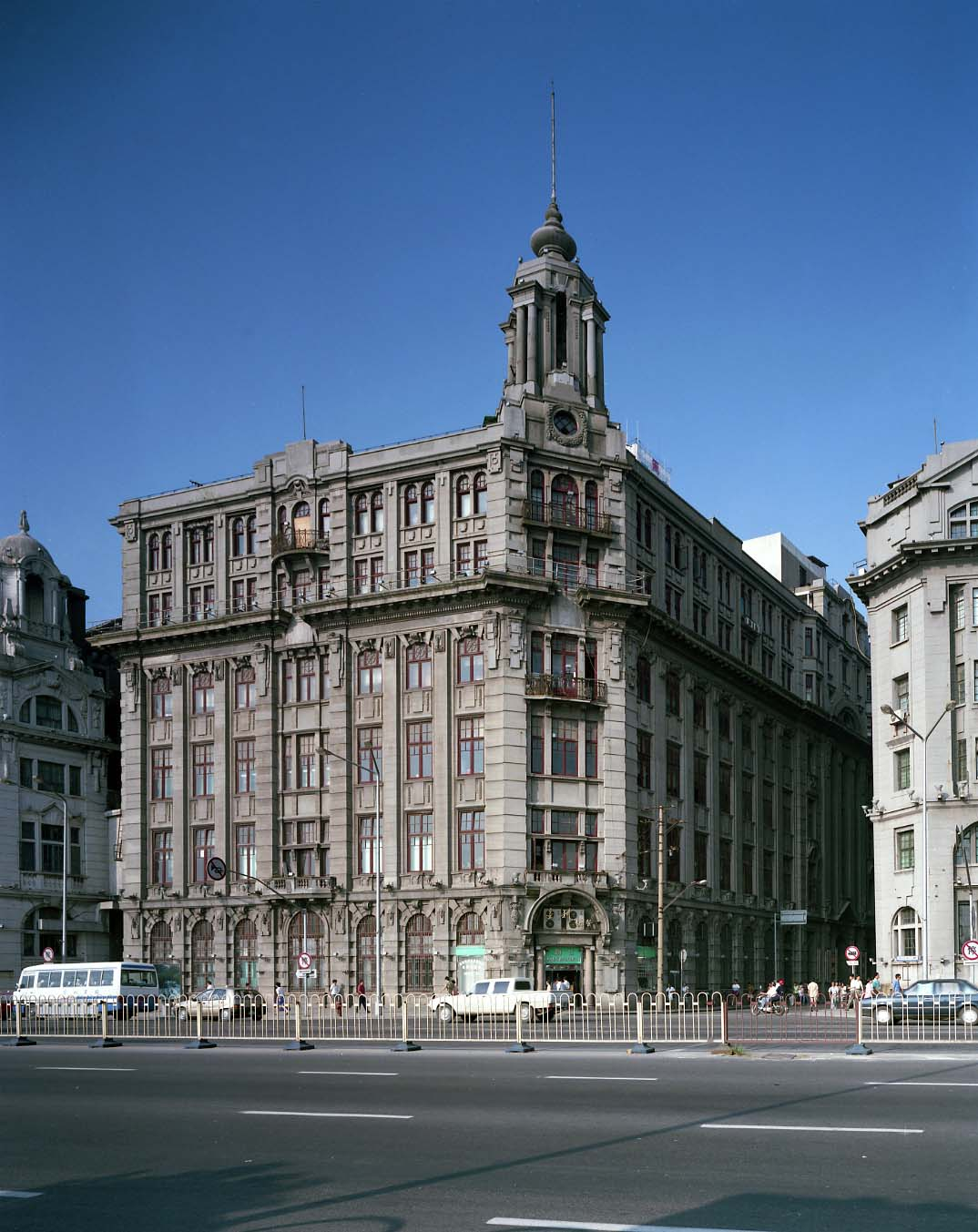
Union Insurance Building in 1994

The building is in Neo-Renaissance style with a symmetrical facade, but with some Baroque style details. The roof features a domed corner pavilion.

In 1937, the Japanese Imperial Army threatened Shanghai. Being unable to indemnify war damages, the insurance companies had their assets frozen. The Union Bank then purchased the building. In 1949 the Union Bank evacuated from Shanghai in the wake of the Communist takeover. From 1953 the building was used by the Shanghai Civil Architecture and Design Institute. In 1997 Singaporean company Giti Tire purchased the building, and in 2004 converted it to a shopping centre, called "Three on the Bund". The restoration was led by American architect Michael Graves who meticulously restored the Beaux-Arts facade, reinforced the structure, and installed new building systems. He hailed his efforts as a model of adaptive reuse and won the 2006 design in Asia award.
