= Southern Company Gas =

American Fortune 500 energy services holding company headquartered in Atlanta, Georgia

- Formerly: AGL Resources
- Type: Subsidiary
- Industry: Natural gas
- Headquarters: Atlanta, Georgia, United States
- Area served: United States
- Key people: Jim Kerr (president & CEO)
- Revenue: ▲US$4.617 billion (FY 2013)
- Operating income: ▲US$686 million (FY 2013)
- Net income: ▲US$313 million (FY 2013)
- Total assets: ▲US$14.656 billion (FY 2013)
- Total equity: ▲US$3.676 billion (FY 2013)
- Number of employees: 6,094 (Dec 2013)
- Parent: Southern Company
- Website: www.southerncompanygas.com

AGL Resources logo

Southern Company Gas, formerly AGL Resources, is an American Fortune 500 energy services holding company headquartered in Atlanta, Georgia. The company's operations consist of natural gas distribution, wholesale services, retail operations, and midstream operations. Southern Company Gas is one of the largest natural gas distribution companies in the United States. The company serves approximately 4.5 million utility customers through its regulated distribution subsidiaries across four states. Southern Company Gas made the Fortune 500 list in 2015, Forbes 2000 in 2006, and is a member of the S&P 500 Index. In 2016, Southern Company acquired AGL Resources and renamed it Southern Company Gas.

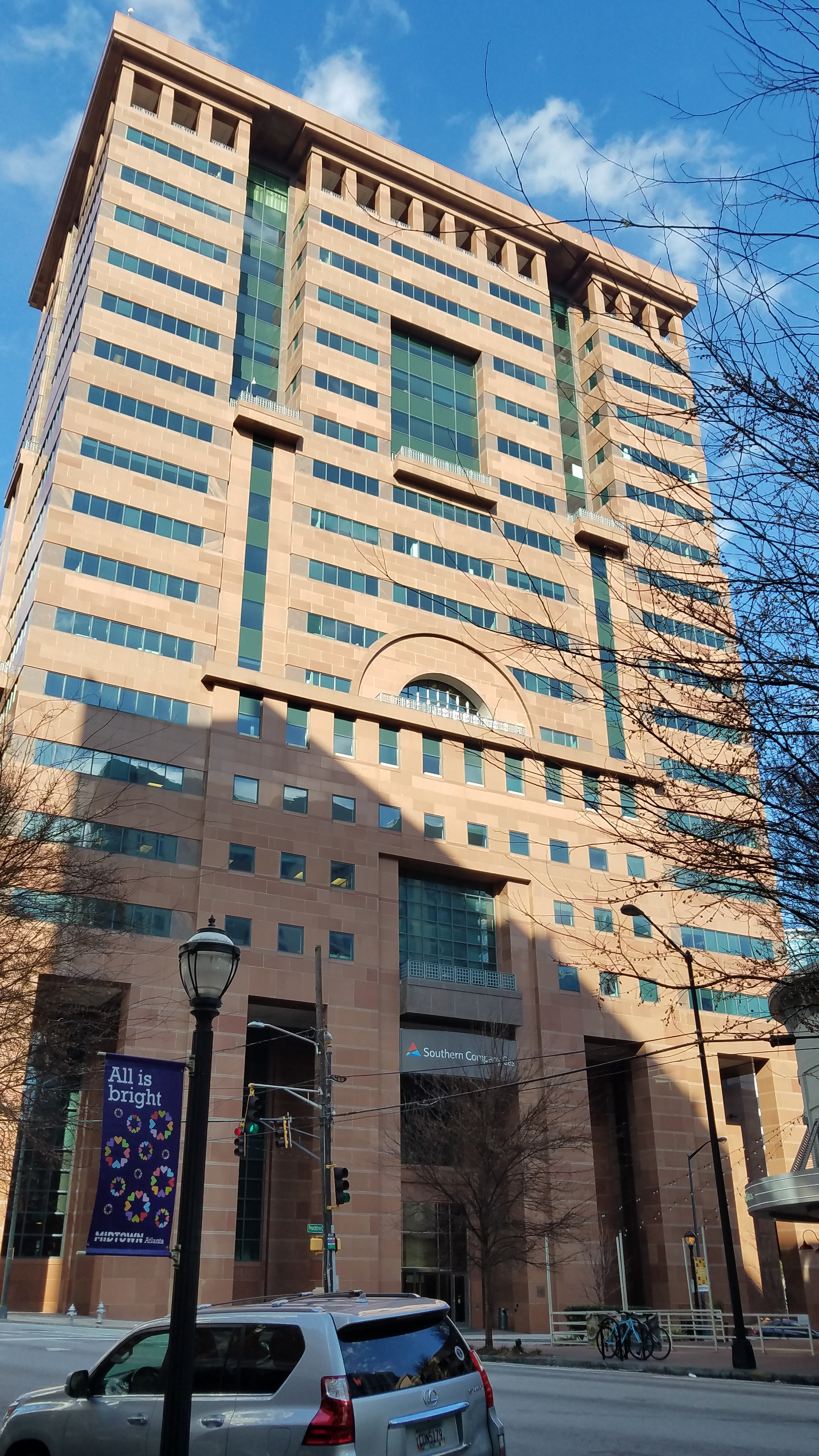
Ten Peachtree Place, Southern Company Gas's headquarters

== Distribution operations ==
Southern Company Gas distribution operations feature four utilities that deliver natural gas to approximately 4.5 million customers and is the largest component of the business. As of February 2014, the distribution operations consist of Nicor Gas in Illinois, Atlanta Gas Light in Georgia, Virginia Natural Gas in Virginia and Chattanooga Gas in Tennessee. The utilities construct, manage and maintain intrastate natural gas pipelines, distribution facilities and storage facilities. They also respond to and repair gas leaks and other requests for service and are responsible for meter reading. Most of their customers buy their natural gas directly from the Southern Company Gas utilities. However some customers in Illinois and all of the customers in Georgia buy natural gas from their choice of retail marketers due to deregulation in these states.

Each subsidiary provides these primary services:

- Maintains the gas pipeline infrastructure
- Responds to and repairs gas leaks
- Sells natural gas service to residential, commercial and industrial customers; excluding Atlanta Gas Light
- Offers customer service and bills customers for gas service; excluding Atlanta Gas Light
- Offers online customer information about natural gas and natural gas-fueled products

=== Atlanta Gas Light ===
Atlanta Gas Light, is the largest natural gas distributor in the Southeast and is headquartered in Atlanta. It was founded in 1856 to install gas streetlights in Atlanta. The company now distributes natural gas to more than 1.6 million residential, commercial, and industrial customers in 200 communities throughout the state of Georgia. Additional services include:

- Maintenance of the gas system infrastructure, including response to gas leaks
- Meter reading

=== Chattanooga Gas ===
Chattanooga Gas provides retail natural gas sales and transportation services to approximately 62,000 customers in Hamilton and Bradley counties in Tennessee. It was founded in 1890 and is headquartered in Chattanooga, Tennessee. In 1988, Atlanta Gas Light acquired Chattanooga Gas Company.

=== Nicor Gas ===
Nicor Gas was founded in 1955 and it is the largest natural gas distributor in northern Illinois, serving 2.2 million residential, commercial and industrial customers in more than 650 communities. Nicor Gas customers are connected to a 34,000 mile distribution system that is part of a network of eight interstate pipelines. AGL Resources acquired Nicor Inc. in merger, which was completed in December 2011.

=== Virginia Natural Gas ===
Virginia Natural Gas was founded in 1850 and provides natural gas service to more than 275,000 residential, commercial and industrial customers in southeastern Virginia. It serves the communities of Norfolk, Virginia Beach, Chesapeake, Suffolk, Hampton, Newport News, Williamsburg, and Hanover Counties. The company continues to be one of the fastest-growing natural gas distribution companies in the country. Additional services include:

- Operating a 150-mile (240 km) high-pressure intrastate pipeline originating in Quantico and terminating in Williamsburg, Virginia
- Operating two propane storage and vaporization facilities and a Liquefied Natural Gas (LNG) facility located in James City County and Chesapeake to supplement natural gas supplies as needed

Formerly the natural gas operations of Dominion Virginia Power, VNG was sold to Consolidated Natural Gas in 1990. When CNG was acquired by Dominion in 2000, VNG was sold to AGL Resources.

== Wholesale services ==
Wholesale services engages in natural gas storage, gas pipeline arbitrage, and provides natural gas asset management and related logistics services for most of our utilities, as well as for non-affiliated companies.

=== Nicor Enerchange ===
Nicor Enerchange is Sequent Energy Management's Illinois- based brand for providing Commercial and Industrial customers’ natural gas procurement services. Founded in 1998, Nicor Enerchange is a wholesale natural gas supplier to the Midwest market.

== Energy investments ==
=== Liquefied natural gas (LNG) ===
Southern Company Gas owns and operates four LNG peak-shaving facilities, which supply gas at peak use times.

The largest, the Riverdale LNG plant in Riverdale, Georgia, has storage capacity of 31,080,000 gallons or 2,560,000 million cubic feet (Mcf) of natural gas in its two tanks. Located south of Atlanta, the plant is supplied by two interstate pipelines for supply. It is connected to the Atlanta Gas Light beltline pipeline system for distribution of gas to the Atlanta market. The plant is able to deliver 400,000 Mcf/day of gas during peak send-out.

The Cherokee LNG plant, located north of Atlanta in Ball Ground, Georgia, has storage capacity of 25,242,957 gallons or 2,020,237 Mcf equivalent of natural gas in a single tank. The 934-acre (3.78 km^{2}) site was designed to accommodate a second tank of equal capacity if warranted. This plant receives supply from three pipelines and can deliver an equivalent of 400,000 Mcf/day of peak send-out to AGL's Atlanta market.

Southern Company Gas also owns and operates an LNG plant in Macon, Georgia. This plant's single tank storage capacity is 18,900,000 gallons or the equivalent of 1,501,983 Mcf. Although the plant is capable of delivering up to 150,000 Mcf/day, the pipeline system exiting the plant can accommodate a delivery of less than half that volume, of only 70,000 Mcf/day.

In Tennessee, Chattanooga Gas, another Southern Company Gas subsidiary, receives peak day supplies from the company's Chattanooga plant, which holds the equivalent of 1,186,035 Mcf. This facility is supplied by two pipelines and can deliver up to 90,000 Mcf/day to the Chattanooga Gas market.

Southern Company Gas, through Virginia Natural Gas (VNG), also owns some storage capacity — 752,174 Mcf equivalent — in the Columbia Natural Gas Company-operated Chesapeake LNG facility. This plant is located at the end of the Columbia pipeline that supplies VNG's south system. To more fully utilize this contracted capacity, VNG constructed an LNG vaporization plant adjacent to its propane plant in 2002. This system is capable of adding up to 14,400 Mcf/day into the VNG system by trucking LNG from the Chesapeake plant to the vaporization plant.

== Retail services ==
Southern Company Gas retail operations include four companies that provide natural gas and offer natural gas-related services, with millions of customers in dozens of states across the U.S.

=== Nicor Advanced Energy ===
Nicor Advanced Energy was established in 2004 as an unregulated affiliate of Nicor Gas. It is an alternative natural gas supplier offering energy plans to residential and small business customers in the Nicor Gas, Peoples Gas and the North Shore Gas service areas. Nicor Advanced Energy is certified with the Illinois Commerce Commission.

=== Nicor Solutions ===
Established in 1991, Nicor Solutions offers energy-related billing services for residential and small business customers.

=== Southstar Energy Services ===
SouthStar provides natural gas supply, transportation and other related services, serving more than a half a million residential, small business, large commercial and industrial customers in several states.

== Former subsidiaries ==
=== Elizabethtown Gas ===
Elizabethtown Gas was founded in 1855 and is headquartered in Union, New Jersey. It delivers service to more than 277,000 residential, business and industrial natural gas customers in New Jersey, making it he state's smallest energy provider. The utility serves Union, Middlesex, Sussex, Warren, Hunterdon, Morris and Mercer counties. In 2004, Elizabethtown Gas was purchased by AGL Resources. Additional services include:

- Maintaining the gas pipeline infrastructure
- Responding to and repairing leaks

Elizabethtown Gas was sold to South Jersey Industries in July 2018.

=== Elkton Gas ===
Elkton Gas was founded in 1863 and provides natural gas service to approximately 6,000 residential and commercial customers in the greater Elkton area of Maryland's eastern shore, near the Delaware border. The company became part of AGL Resources in 2004. Additional services include:

- Maintenance and repair of heating systems and appliances
- Assistance in converting to natural gas from other fuels

Elkton Gas was sold to South Jersey Industries in July 2018.

=== Florida City Gas ===
Florida City Gas was founded in 1946 provides natural gas service to more than 104,000 residential and commercial customers in Miami-Dade, Brevard, St. Lucie, and Indian River counties. Florida City Gas became part of AGL Resources in 2004. Additional services include:

- Maintaining the gas pipeline infrastructure
- Responding to and repairing leaks

Florida City Gas was sold to NextEra Energy in July 2018.

=== Jefferson Island Storage & Hub ===
Jefferson Island Storage & Hub (JISH) is a salt dome natural gas facility and is located near Erath, Louisiana (Vermillion and Iberia parishes). At JISH, two underground salt caverns are used to store gas before it is put into pipelines and sent to residential and commercial customers. These caverns have a total capacity of 9.4 billion cubic feet and connect to the Henry Hub via the Sabine pipeline.

Jefferson Island Storage & Hub was sold to Enlink Midstream, LLC. in December 2020.

=== Pivotal Home Solutions ===
Pivotal Home Solutions offers home repair and maintenance services that can be customized for customers in Connecticut and Massachusetts, Florida, Illinois, Indiana, Maryland, Ohio, Pennsylvania, Kentucky, Tennessee and Virginia. Pivotal Home Solutions also offers natural gas appliance leasing in Florida and Massachusetts.

Pivotal Home Solutions was sold to American Water Works Company, Inc. in June 2018.

=== Sequent Energy Management ===
Sequent Energy Management was a Houston-based subsidiary of Southern Company Gas and was primarily involved in asset optimization and energy marketing and trading. It was established in 2001.

Sequent Energy Management was sold to Williams Company in July 2021.

== Revenue ==
According to CNNMoney, in 2013 AGL Resources reported a $8 million increase in net revenue against the previous year. Its 2012 net revenue was $3.9 billion compared to $4.7 billion in 2013. The company's earnings per share increased 33 cents from $2.31 in 2012 to $2.64 in 2013.

== Executive team ==
The chairman, president and CEO of Southern Company Gas is Jim Kerr. The executive vice president and chief financial officer of Southern Company Gas is Grace Kolvereid.

== Corporate social responsibility ==
Southern Company Gas cites four areas of focus in its corporate social responsibility program: energy assistance, education, environmental stewardship and community enrichment.

Additionally, all of Southern Company Gas's 6,094 employees are welcome to participate in the company's "V-Force" program. V-Force, short for Volunteer Force, provides volunteer opportunities for employees including activities such as the walking for the March of Dimes, building houses for Habitat for Humanity and teaching students how to manage money through the Junior Achievement program.
