= 425 Fifth Avenue =

Residential skyscraper in Manhattan, New York

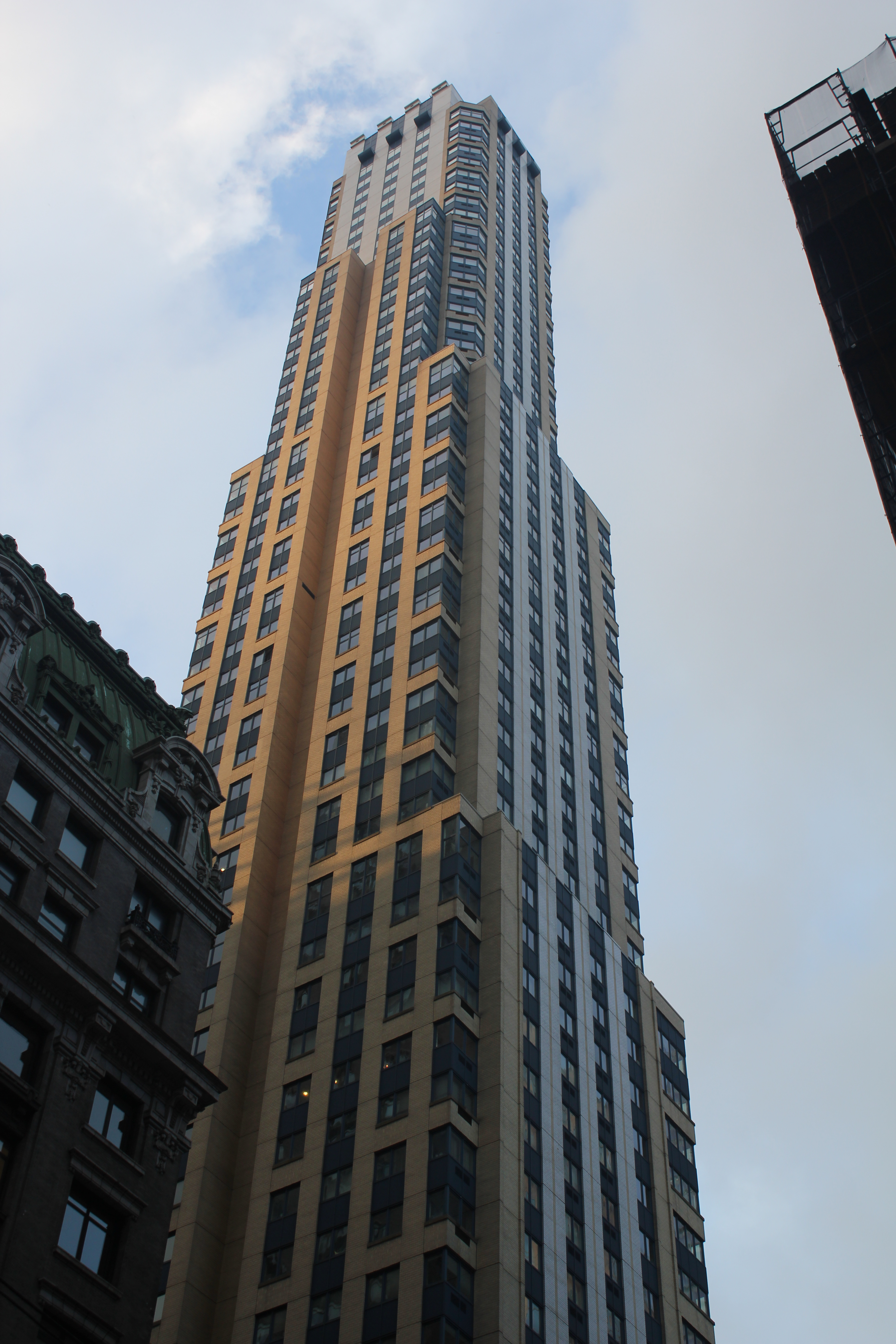
- Interactive map of the 425 Fifth Avenue area
- Alternative names: The Envoy

General information
- Status: Completed
- Type: Residential
- Location: Manhattan, New York 10016; United States
- Coordinates: 40.751°N 73.9822°W
- Construction started: 2001
- Completed: 2003
- Owner: RFR Realty LLC

Height
- Roof: 618 ft (188 m)

Technical details
- Material: Concrete
- Floor count: 55
- Floor area: 27,291 m² (293,758 ft²)
- Lifts/elevators: 11

Design and construction
- Architect: Michael Graves
- Developer: Davis and Partners, LLP
- Structural engineer: DeSimone Consulting Engineers
- Main contractor: Tishman Construction

Website
- 425fifth.com

425 Fifth Avenue is a 618-foot (188-meter) residential skyscraper at 38th Street and Fifth Avenue in Midtown Manhattan, New York City. It was developed by RFR Davis and designed by Michael Graves. It has 55 floors and 197 units. The building uses air rights from two small adjoining buildings and a zoning bonus for providing a public plaza to maximize its floor area. As of July 2016, it is the 96th-tallest building in New York City.

The building's site was originally home to a 5-story structure known as the Siebrecht Building which was home to Pierre Abraham Lorillard. Construction started in late 1999. The original architect of the project was Robert A. M. Stern, who was replaced by Michael Graves in 2001. The building topped-out in April 2002, and was opened that September.

== See also ==
- List of tallest buildings in New York City
