= Ten Peachtree Place =

High rise office building in Atlanta, Georgia

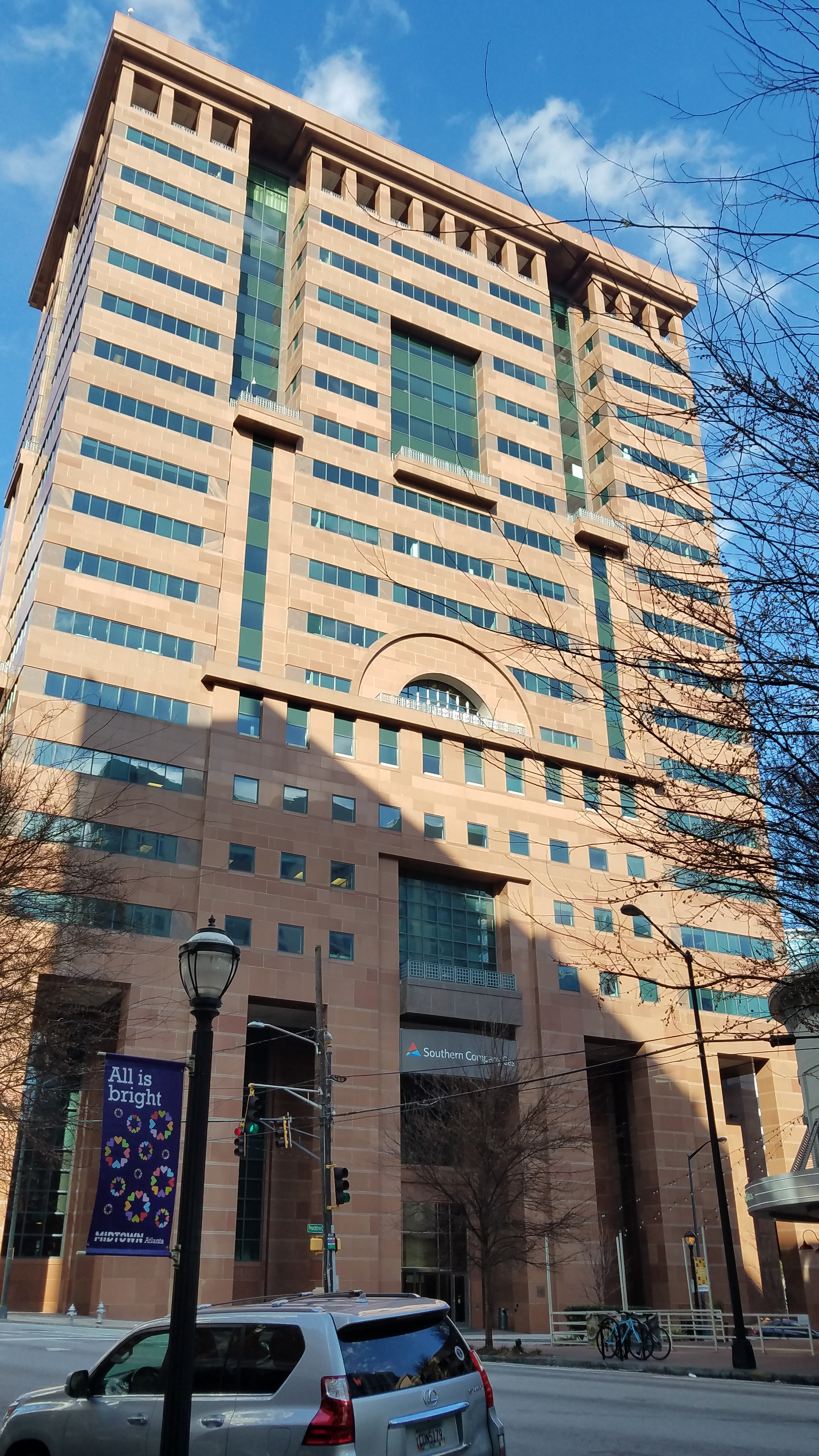
- Ten Peachtree Place, 2019

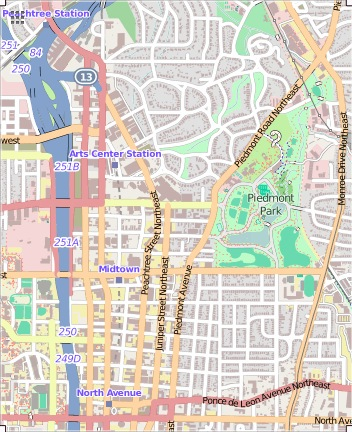
- Location within Atlanta Midtown Ten Peachtree Place (Atlanta) Ten Peachtree Place (Georgia) Ten Peachtree Place (the United States)
- Alternative names: Coca-Cola Computer Center

General information
- Type: Office
- Architectural style: Postmodern
- Location: 10 Peachtree Place NE; Atlanta, Georgia 30309
- Coordinates: 33.7810°N 84.3871°W
- Construction started: 1988
- Completed: 1989

Height
- Height: 257.17 ft (78.39 m)

Technical details
- Floor count: 20
- Floor area: 260,000 sq ft (24,000 m^{2})
- Lifts/elevators: 6

Design and construction
- Architect: Michael Graves

Ten Peachtree Place is a high-rise class A office building in midtown Atlanta, Georgia. The building was designed by Michael Graves and completed in 1989. It currently serves as the headquarters for Southern Company Gas. The building is notable for its 30 ft (9.1 m) high arch and red granite exterior that contrasts with the building's dark windows.

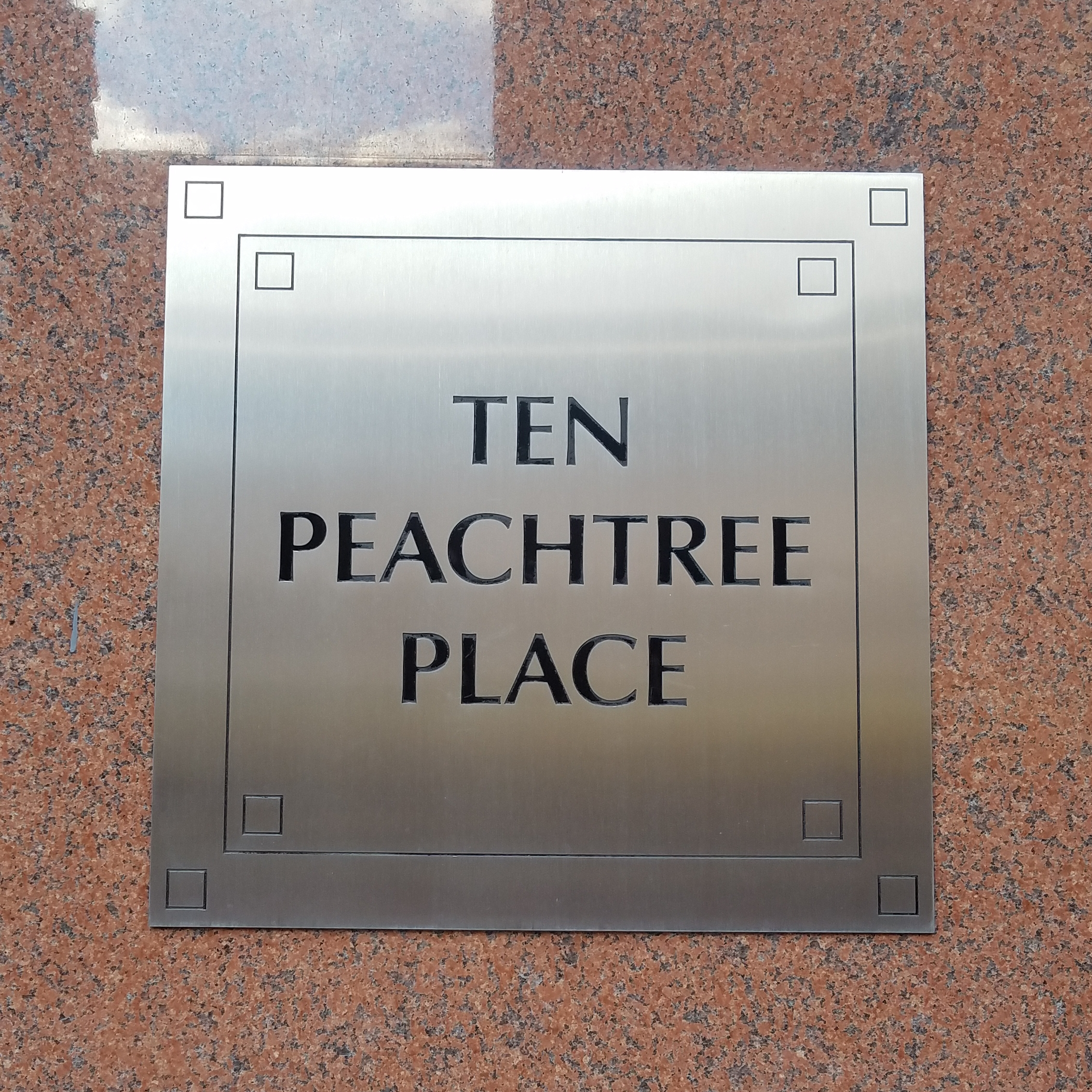
Ten Peachtree Place placard

== History ==
The building, designed by American architect Michael Graves, opened in 1989. It was originally intended to be a part of LJ Hooker's Gateway Atlanta project before that company declared bankruptcy shortly after the building's opening. One of the first major tenants in the building was the Coca-Cola Company, leading to the building sometimes being referred to as the Coca-Cola Computer Center. In 2002, the building underwent a $30 million renovation focusing primarily on the building's interior. In 2012, Prudential Real Estate Investors (the real estate division of Prudential Financial) purchased the building from a partnership between Cousins Properties and the Coca-Cola Company for $61 million, retaining Cousins Properties to manage the property. In 2014, AGL Resources (now Southern Company Gas), took full occupancy of the building, which serves as its corporate headquarters.
