= Snyderman House =

Modernist house in Indiana

Coordinates: 41°1′2.1462″N 85°18′32.07″W

Snyderman House before the 2002 arson

The Snyderman House was a widely published single-family residence in Fort Wayne, Indiana, designed for Sanford and Joy Snyderman in 1972 by architect Michael Graves. Celebrated in both the architectural and popular press as a tour-de-force of late modernism, it was a splendid example of Graves' imaginative, sophisticated work. It stood, along with Graves' Hanselman House, Richard Meier's New Harmony Athenaeum —which was related to the Snyderman House—and the buildings of Columbus, Indiana, as national icons of modern architecture located in the state of Indiana (Graves' home state).

== Significance ==
In her 1978 article on the Snyderman House in Progressive Architecture, Suzanne Stephens wrote that "Because of the house's successful fragments and particular spaces, because of its manner of referring back to previous work as well as anticipating that which is to come, it will probably occupy a prominent place in the history of Michael Graves' oeuvre."

Martin Filler, in an overview of Graves' work as of 1980, wrote that "The Synderman House is a central work in Michael Graves' career. It is his largest completed building to date, but its significance comes not from its size. It is transitional work, and transitional works in architecture are much rarer than in other art forms, a result of the architectural artifact taking so long to produce. The Snyderman House, designed in 1972 and completed five years later, spans Michael Graves' two stylistic phases. The house is composed of a white, cage-like exterior frame, typical of his first projects. But within that Cubist grill are set massive volumes--sheer gray wall planes, an undulating terra cotta facade--and relatively small expanses of glass, all of which are more characteristic of his current projects. This is an early Michael Graves building with a later Michael Graves building trapped inside it, fighting to emerge. Its debt both in form and color to the earlier work of John Hejduk, and its impact on later work by other architects (such as Richard Meier's Atheneum of 1975-70 in New Harmony, Ind.) confirm it as an important work of the 1970's."

The Snyderman House's bold coloration already suggested Graves' moving away from the narrower definitions of modernism of his earliest career, such as sometimes characterized the group of architects with whom he was associated, dubbed "The New York Five."

Given Graves' rapidly developed a more referential architecture after the Snyderman House, an approach that deliberately sought to establish connections with the history and culture of architecture by using or referring to familiar elements of buildings.

== Destruction ==
The Snyderman House burned to the ground on July 30, 2002, as the result of suspected arson. After living in the home for 25 years, the Snydermans had sold the house in 1999 to local developers Joseph Sullivan and William Swift, who planned to tear it down as part of a large housing development. Fort Wayne government officials blocked the development under pressure from local preservation groups, and one non-profit organization attempted to raise money to buy the house and surrounding land from the developers, who had let the abandoned building fall into disrepair.

== Bibliography ==
"Snyderman House," 23rd Annual Design Awards, Progressive Architecture, January 1976.

"Living in a Work of Art: Snyderman House, Fort Wayne, In," Suzanne Stephens, Progressive Architecture, March 1978.

"Color from the Outside In," House and Garden, September 1978.

Michael Graves, Architectural Monographs 5, David Dunster, editor, 1979.

"Michael Graves: Before and After," Martin Filler, Art in America, September 1980.

Michael Graves, 1966–1981, Karen Wheeler, Peter Arnell and Ted Bickford, editors, 1982.
