= Arts Council of Princeton =

Non-profit organization based in Princeton, New Jersey, US

The Arts Council of Princeton
- Founded: 1967
- Founder: Bill Selden & Anne Reeves
- Type: Non-profit
- Location: Princeton, New Jersey
- Coordinates: 40.35220°N 74.66116°W
- Region served: Princeton Community
- Key people: Anne Reeves, Jeff Nathanson, Taneshia Nash Laird, Jim Levine
- Website: http://artscouncilofprinceton.org/

The Arts Council of Princeton was established in 1967, by Bill Selden, in Princeton, New Jersey. Selden was also the first President of the organization.

== History ==
In 1982, Anne Reeves, then President of Arts Council of Princeton, entered into an agreement with the Borough of New Jersey for the occupation of 102 Witherspoon Street.

In April 1997, the Arts Council of Princeton purchased its facility at 102 Witherspoon Street from the Borough of Princeton. Michael Graves, an American architect and native to Princeton, designed the renovated building and agreed to donate his design to the Council.

Anne Reeves announced her retirement in 2005 and assumed the role as Founding Director. She had served as Executive Director since the founding of the Council. In May 2005, the Board of Trustees hired Jeff Nathanson to serve as the new Executive Director.

Under Nathanson, the organization undertook the complete renovation of the Council's home at 102 Witherspoon. The new building reopened in June 2008 and now includes a gallery, theater, multi-disciplinary art studios and public meeting space. The Arts Council of Princeton commemorated its 50th anniversary in 2017 with a year-long celebration.

Nathanson served through June 2016, when he announced his retirement.

In November 2016, the board announced it had appointed Taneshia Nash Laird to succeed Nathanson. Laird served as the Executive Director from January 2017 through August 2018, when she publicly announced her resignation. Jim Levine, at the time the organization's Board president, stepped down from that role to serve as interim executive director. Maria Evans, the artistic director of the organization, continued to oversee programming and education.

== Awards ==
- New Jersey State Council on the Arts – Citation of Excellence - (2008), (2009), (2010), (2011), (2012), (2013), (2014), (2015)
- New Jersey State Council on the Arts – Major Service Organization - (2008), (2009), (2010), (2011), (2012), (2013), (2014), (2015)
- Discover Jersey Arts – People's Choice Award for Favorite Art Gallery - (2011), (2012), (2013), (2014), (2016), (2017), (2018)
- Homefront of Trenton – Recognition for Program Partnership - (2011)
- NJ Governor's Award for Excellence in Arts Education - (2011)
- Princeton Nursery School – School House Partner Award - (2012)
