= The New York Five =

American group of architects

The New York Five was a group of architects based in New York City whose work was featured in the 1972 book Five Architects. The architects, Peter Eisenman, Michael Graves, Charles Gwathmey, John Hejduk, and Richard Meier, are also often referred to as "the Whites". Other architects and theorists have been associated with the group, including Werner Seligmann, Kenneth Frampton, Colin Rowe, and Gwathmey's partner Robert Siegel.

== Five Architects ==
The work featured in Five Architects was originally developed in a series of meetings held by the Committee of Architects for the Study of the Environment (CASE) at the Museum of Modern Art. The director of MoMA's Department of Architecture and Design, Arthur Drexler, invited a group of architects to present photographs of recent built projects to a panel of critics. Another meeting followed in 1971. Drexler edited a volume of work by five of these architects, published in 1972 by Wittenborn & Company and reprinted by Oxford University Press in 1975. Five Architects featured a preface by Drexler and critical essays by Colin Rowe and Kenneth Frampton. Later editions included a postscript by Philip Johnson.

The name "Whites" was used to refer to the group in the architectural press by 1973. Michael Graves later stated that he did not know who originally coined "the Whites," but Philip Johnson was the first to refer to the group as "the New York Five." "The Whites" describes the frequent use of white paint in the built works of the New York Five, as well as the white cardboard models they frequently presented. It also alludes to the group's affinity with the work of Le Corbusier, such as the white exterior surfaces of Villa Savoye. This affinity would later be used by some critics to suggest that the work of the New York Five was uncritical of modernism, or that their work was an unimaginative copy of Le Corbusier.

== Response and legacy ==
In response to Five Architects, Robert A. M. Stern organized a forum of responses, titled "Five on Five," that was published in the May 1973 issue of Architectural Forum. The five responding architects were Romaldo Giurgola, Allan Greenberg, Charles Moore, Jaquelin T. Robertson, and Stern himself.

This group would come to be known as "the Grays" and were closely associated with Vincent Scully and Philadelphia architect Robert Venturi, as well as the emerging interest in vernacular architecture, New Classical Architecture, and early postmodernism, with three of "the Grays" and one of "the Whites" eventually winning the prestigious Driehaus Architecture Prize.
