= Irwin Rubin =

American artist and academic (1930–2006)

- Irwin Rubin at his desk, late 1950s
- Born: 1930; Brooklyn, New York
- Died: April 6, 2006 (aged 75–76); Brooklyn, New York
- Known for: Artist and educator
- Website: irwinrubin.com

Irwin Rubin (1930 – April 6, 2006) was an American artist and educator known for his colorfully painted wood constructions.

== Biography ==
Irwin Rubin was born in Brooklyn, NY in 1930. He studied at the Brooklyn Museum Art School, the Cooper Union, and at the Yale University School of Art and Architecture, where he studied under Josef Albers. Rubin died in Brooklyn, NY in 2006. Rubin had one son, Lucas (born 1971), who was appointed director of the CUNY Latin/Greek Institute in 2020.

== Artistic career ==
Rubin began working with paper collage in 1953. During his early artistic career he did extensive research into the archival properties of collage materials and adhesives, and published his studies in Arts magazine, and in Bernard Chaet's Artists at Work. In the 1960s, Rubin made brightly colored, painted wood constructions. He worked with pegs and blocks in low relief to explore color phenomena spatially, including the effects of primary colors reflected upon white surfaces.

Rubin was represented by the Bertha Schaefer Gallery, where he participated in several group exhibitions that focused on hybrid forms, featuring young artists working between painting and sculpture. His work was also included in "New Directions" at Pace Gallery, a group show with construction and assemblage contributions by Jim Dine, Bernard Langlais, and Louise Nevelson.

=== Collections ===
Rubin's work is held in the permanent collections of the Sheldon Museum of Art in Lincoln, NE, the Yale University Art Gallery in New Haven, CT, the RISD Museum in Providence, RI, and at the Cooper Hewitt Smithsonian Design Museum, New York, NY.

== Teaching career ==
Rubin held teaching posts at the University of Texas, Austin, Florida State University, and at Cooper Union in New York City. Rubin taught in the Architecture department at UT Austin in the mid 1950s, where he instructed Color and Freehand Drawing courses alongside John Hejduk, Robert Slutzky and others, as part of a group of faculty known as the Texas Rangers. In the 1960s and 70s, Rubin taught Freehand Drawing to Architecture students at Cooper Union, under the leadership of John Hejduk.

Artwork created in Rubin's Freehand Drawing course have been exhibited at the Museum of Modern Art in New York, and reproduced in Education of an Architect: A Point of View, the MoMA exhibition catalog, in Cynthia Dantzic's Design Dimensions: An Introduction to the Visual Surface (Prentice Hall, 1990) and in Alexander Caragonne's The Texas Rangers: Notes from an Architectural Underground, (MIT Press, 1995).
