= Werner Seligmann =

German architect, educator and urban designer (1930–1998)

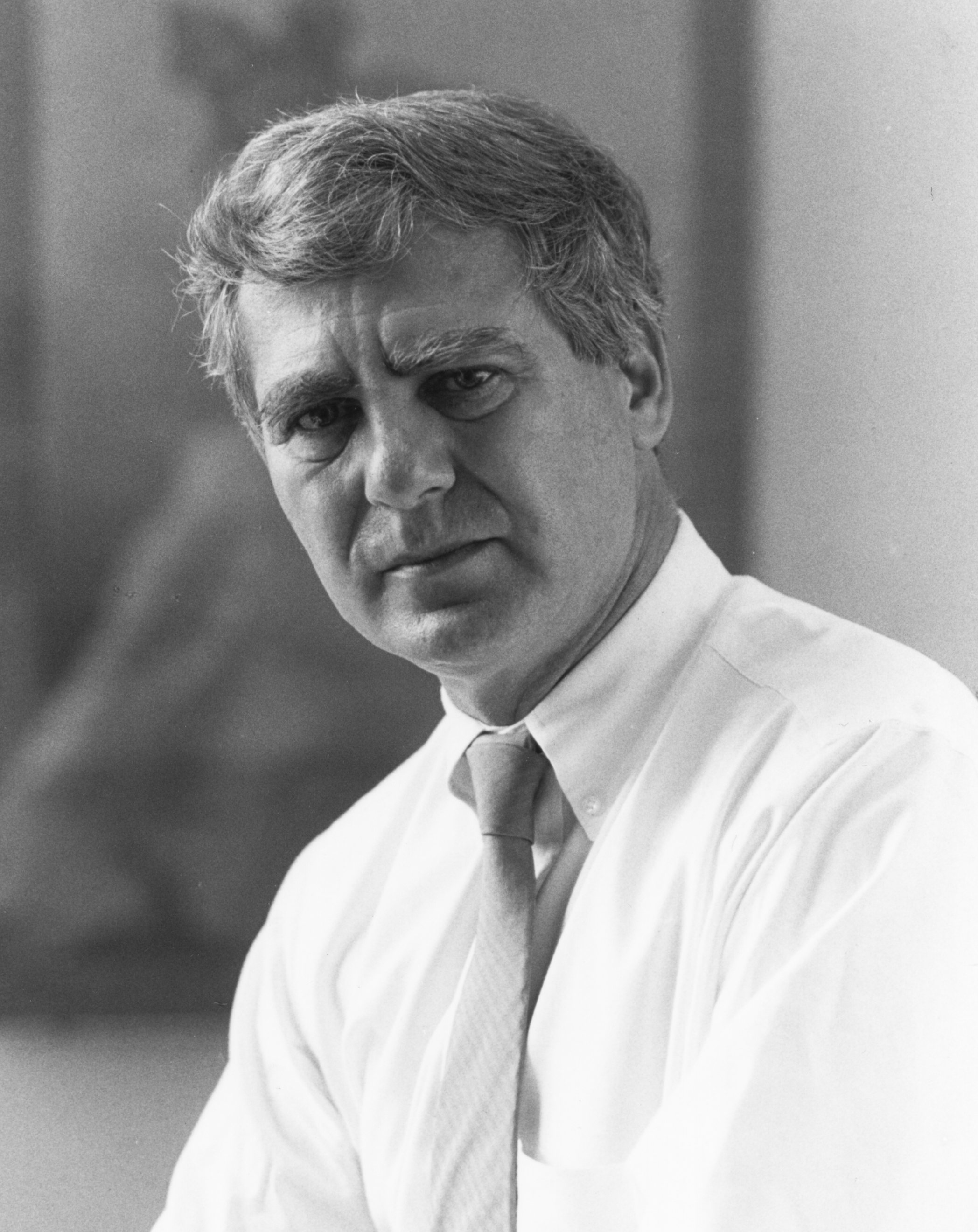
Werner Seligmann. The Syracuse University portrait c. 1986

Werner Seligmann (March 30, 1930 – November 12, 1998) was an architect, urban designer and educator.

== Biography ==
Werner Seligmann was born on March 30, 1930, in Osnabrück, Germany. His father, Fritz, was born December 31, 1902, in Krefeld, Germany, survived a labor camp in Bielefeld and deportation to KZ Theresienstadt, Terezín in Czechoslovakia. He died March 10, 1971, in Garmisch-Partenkirchen. His mother, Charlotte Louise (Czermin), was Fritz's second wife and was born June 1, 1902. She died in KZ Ravensbrück, Germany, about 1944. Fritz was Jewish but Charlotte was not. His sister, Helga Seligmann, was born in Osnabrück September 17, 1931, and died during an Allied bombing raid November 21, 1944 in a Kinderheim (orphan's home) am Schölerberg, Osnabrück, where she lived after the arrest of her mother by the Gestapo From his father, who was a violinist with the Osnabrück city orchestra (Osnabrück Stadttheater), Seligmann inherited a lifelong love of music and the arts in general. He wanted to be a painter, but his father said he should have a better-paying occupation. He was apprenticed to an architect in Münster, Germany.

The family lived in Osnabrück, Germany. Seligmann spent the latter part of the Second World War in a forced labour camp, probably in Bielefeld, where his father was interned. After the camp guards abandoned their posts, he was picked up by American troops and ultimately reunited with his father. This appears to have been in a resettlement camp in Wentorf, Schleswig-Holstein, Germany. Wentorf was a camp for Displaced Persons (DPs) and occupied buildings that had been barracks for the German Army (Wehrmacht). From there, he was sent to the United States in 1949, leaving Bremerhaven aboard the "General J H McRae". He went to live with relatives in Groton, in upstate New York, a short distance from Cornell University in Ithaca. He studied at the Cascadilla School, a preparatory school for Cornell University, to make up for his lost time in high school and to learn English.

Seligmann received his B. Arch. degree from Cornell in 1955. On August 29, 1954, he married Jean Lois Liberman. They had two children: Raphael John and Sabina Charlotte. He became a naturalized citizen in 1955. From 1956 to 1958 he taught as an instructor at the University of Texas in Austin, Texas. There he became part of a small group of faculty that was later nicknamed The Texas Rangers, a name later attributed to Alan Chimacoff and Thomas Schumacher, although Chimacoff disputes this. Chimacoff and Schumacher were then students in the graduate design studio taught by Colin Rowe. The Texas Rangers group included historian Colin Rowe, John Shaw, painter Robert Slutzky, John Hejduk, Lee Hirsche, Bernhard Hoesli, Lee Hodgen, and W. Irving Phillips.Caragonne, Alexander (1994). The Texas Rangers, Notes from an Architectural Underground. MIT Press. ISBN 0-262-03218-X. After the "Texas Rangers" were dismissed, Seligmann pursued graduate study at the Technische Hochschule in Braunschweig, Germany, from 1958 to 1959. He taught as an Assistant at the Eidgenössische Technische Hochschule (the ETH) in Zürich, Switzerland from 1959 to 1961 and was a designer in the office of Hoesli and Aebli, Züich, Switzerland. From 1961 to 1974 he was a professor of architecture at Cornell University and from 1974 to 1976 a professor of architecture at the Graduate School of Design (GSD) at Harvard University. From 1976 to 1990, he was Dean and Professor of Architecture at the Syracuse University School of Architecture. In 1981, Seligmann was named a Fellow of the (American Academy in Rome (FAAR)). In 1986 he was the Eliot Noyes professor at the Harvard Graduate School of Design. In 1988 he was the William Henry Bishop professor at Yale University. In 1994 he was the Thomas Jefferson Visiting professor at the University of Virginia. From 1990 to 1993, he was Professor of Architecture at the ETH Zurich. On his return to Syracuse University, he was named the Distinguished Professor of Architecture.

In 1998 he was awarded The AIA/ACSA Topaz Medallion for Architectural Education, awarded jointly by the Association of Collegiate Schools of Architecture and the American Institute of Architect, the highest award for an architectural educator. In addition to serving as a visiting critic, Seligmann wrote and lectured extensively on the works of Frank Lloyd Wright, Le Corbusier, and other architects and issues.

=== Unresolved biographical issues ===
There are several issues that are missing or contradictory.

1. Sometime in the early 1970s, Seligmann mentioned that his family had "moved south" to avoid capture. No documentary evidence can be found to support this. What can be found is an indication that the family was in Braunschweig, Germany, which is some 100 milies to the east of Osnabrück, Germany. Even the stay in Braunschweig may be in error.
2. During a conversation with Werner Seligmann, the only occasion in which he spoke about his time in captivity, he referred to seeing "waves of bombers flying overhead," something that took "an hour and a half." They were "headed towards Munich, which at that point had no military value because that's where Hitler had his start." There was one bomber raid on Munich, April 24, 1944, that involved some 500 US and British aircraft flying from England to strike Munich. It's possible that this is what he recalled, but it's uncertain. (It might have been the Bombing of Braunschweig (15 October 1944))
3. During the same conversation with Seligmann, he spoke about being in a resettlement camp in Holland and being called to the main office where his father, Fritz, was waiting. It was "the happiest day in my life". Authoritative sources place the resettlement camp in Wentorf, Germany.
4. It was stated that he arrived in the US at the age of 14. Given his birth date, this would be 1944, before the end of World War II. Other sources indicate that he sailed to the US in 1949, at which point he would be 19 years old. He would thus have spent over four years in a resettlement camp. There has been no confirmation of this.
5. Seligmann was quite clear that he was incarcerated "in a camp". He spoke about "waking up one morning, and the gates were open" and "the guards were gone." Other sources state he "survived the Shoah in hiding with another German family."

== Career ==
=== Architectural practice ===
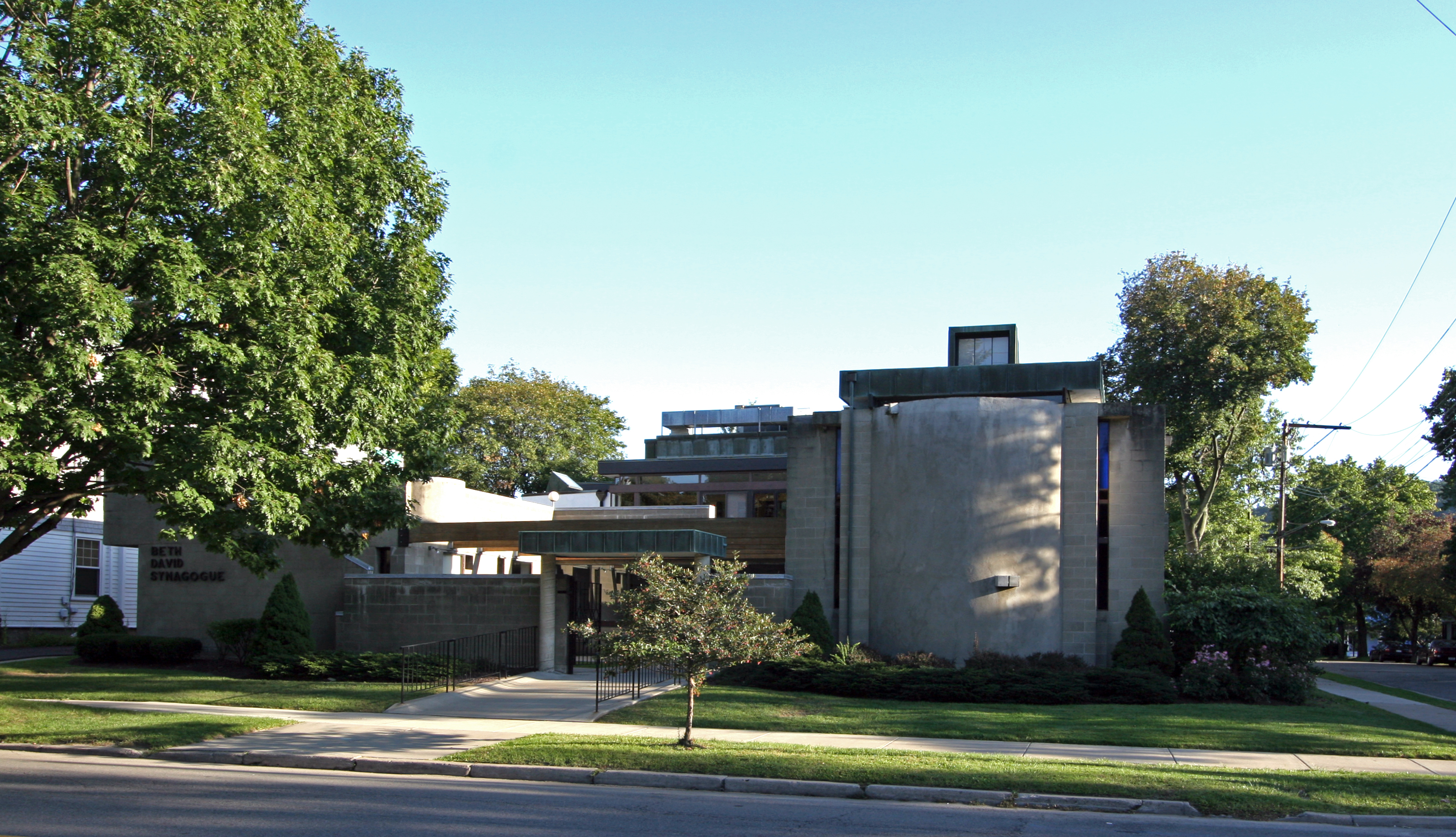
Beth David Synagogue, Binghamton NY, 1963

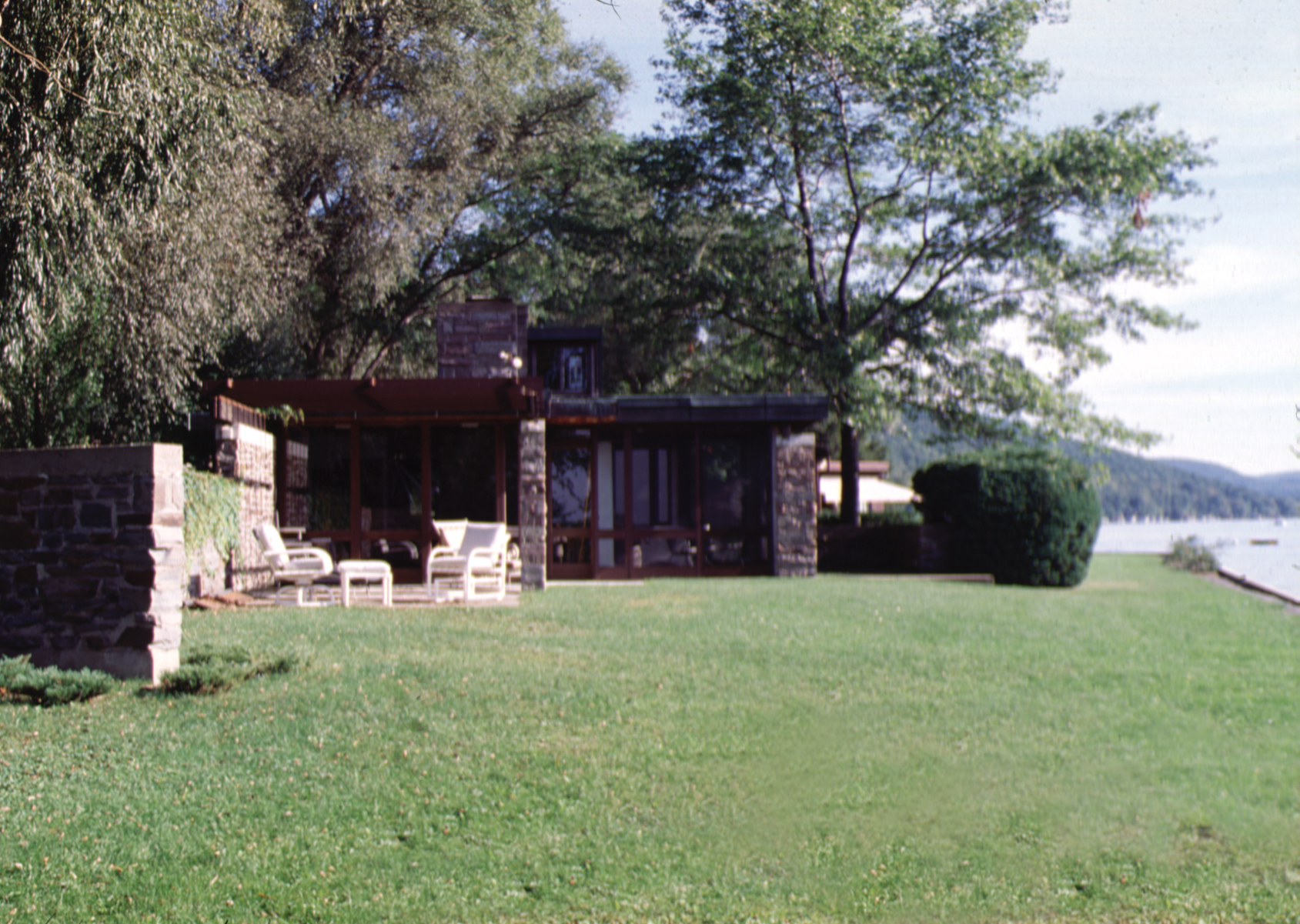
Miller House addition, Skaneateles Lake, 1964

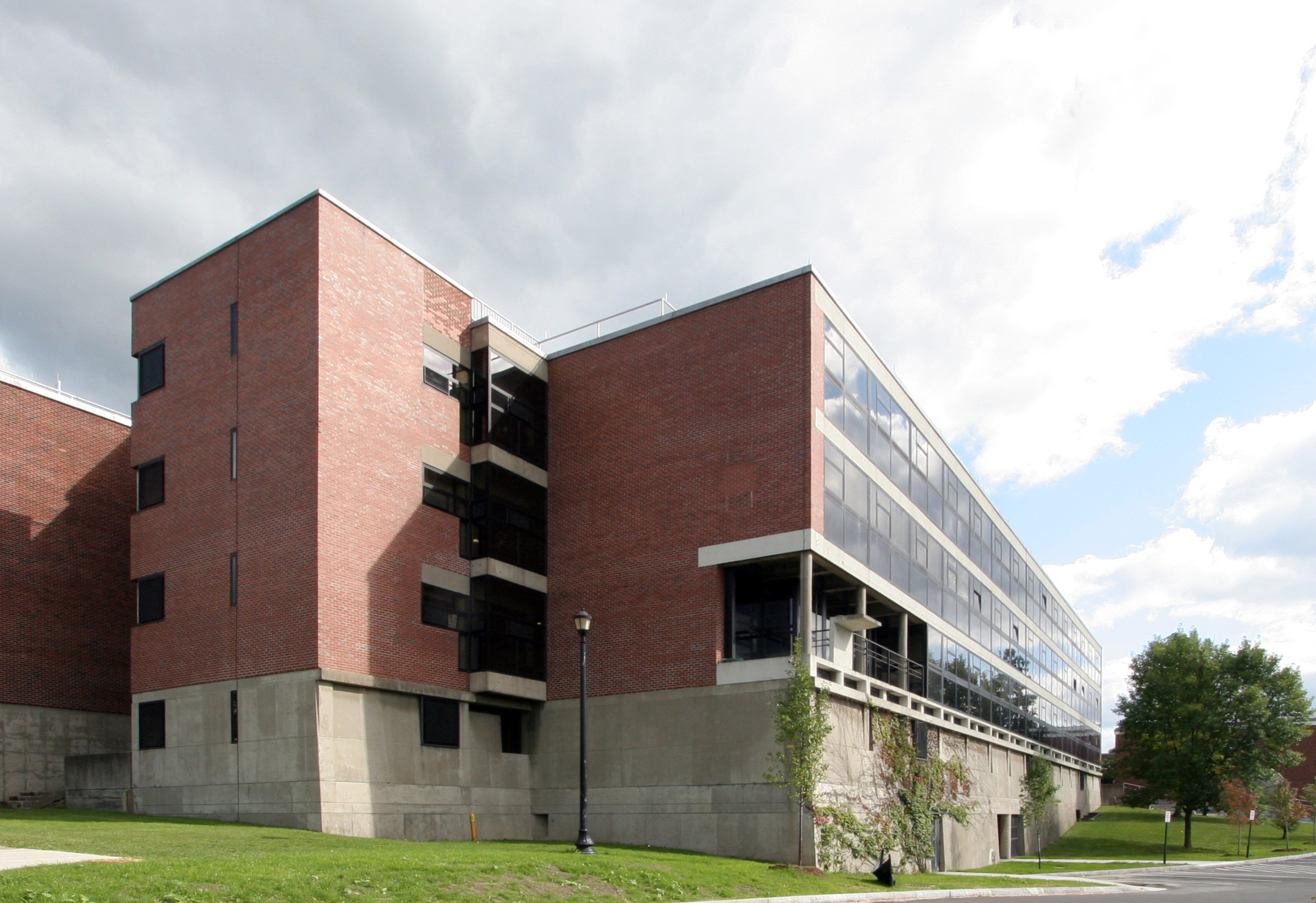
Science Building II at Cortland State University, Cortland NY, 1967

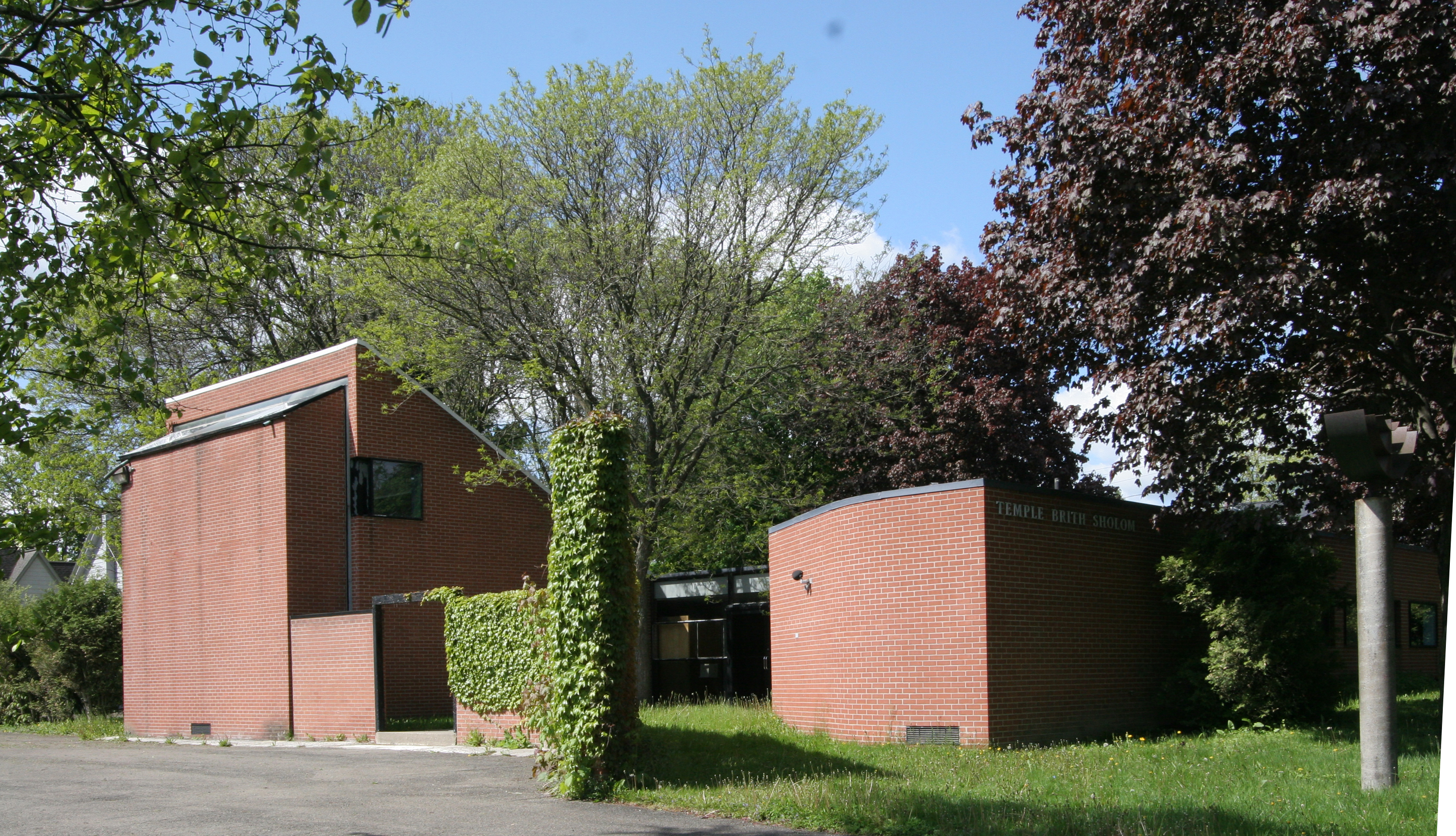
Temple Brith Sholom, Cortland NY, 1969

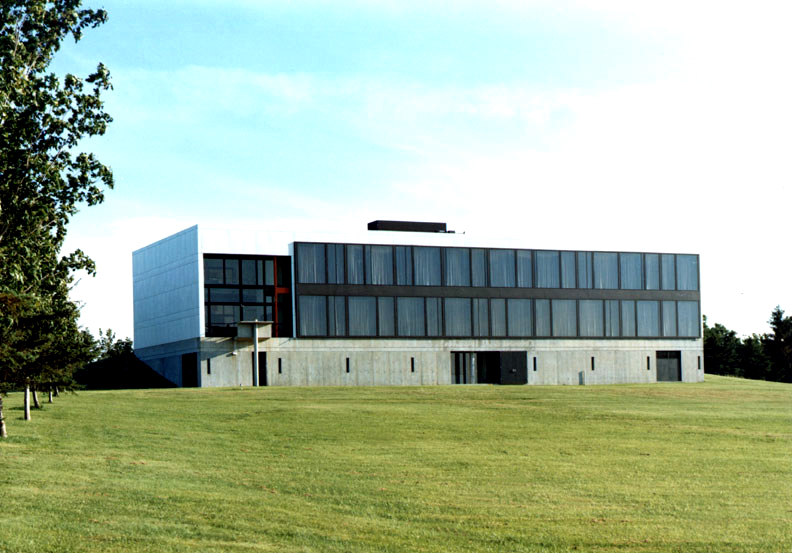
Willard Administration Building, Willard State Hospital, Willard NY, 1971

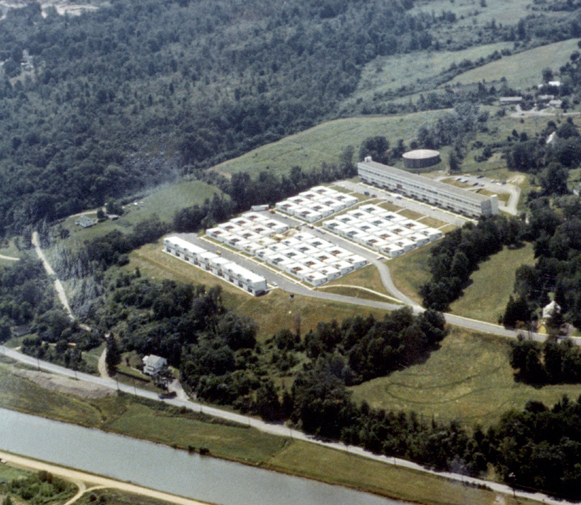
Ithaca Scattered Site House Project, Elm Street Site, 1973

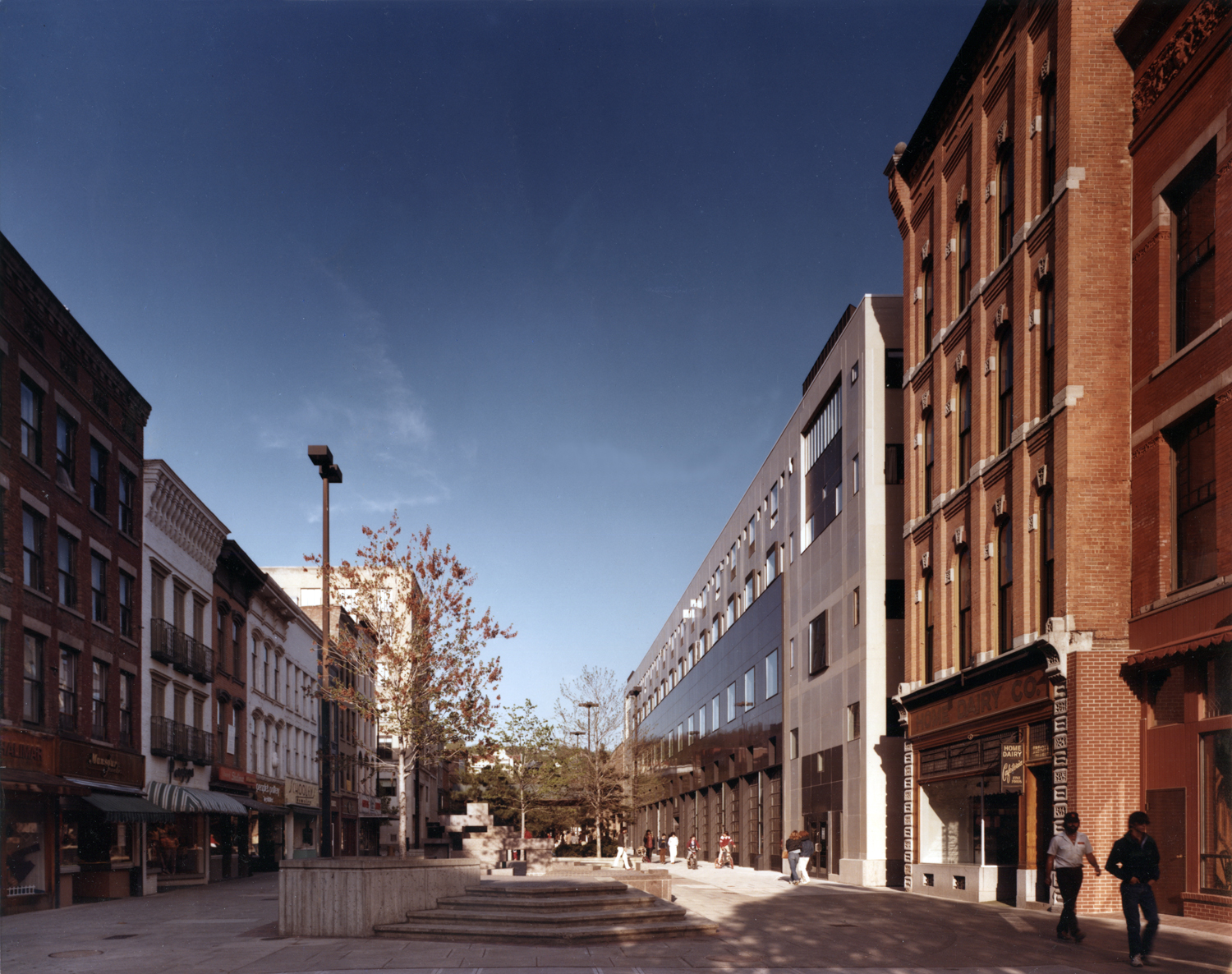
Center Ithaca, Ithaca Commons, Ithaca NY, 1981

Seligmann was registered to practice architecture in 1957 by which he had already designed and constructed three small homes. Throughout his teaching career, he maintained a practice and entered many competitions, including the invited competition, Topography of Terror for Berlin, Germany in 1993. His firm, Werner Seligmann and Associates, Architects and Urban Designers was based in Cortland, New York. Launched in 1961, the firm placed in national and international competitions and work of the firm was published and exhibited often, both in the US and abroad.

The architectural work of Werner Seligmann won two Progressive Architecture Design Awards, was illustrated on the cover of Progressive Architecture journal three times and was placed, or won, several national and international design competitions. Seligmann's work on developing housing prototypes for the New York State Urban Development Corporation in the 1970s and 1980s established his reputation in the design of social housing. The Ithaca Scattered Site Housing Project (now known as Elm Street and Maple Avenue) has been widely exhibited and published. The project's design was included in the permanent collection of the (Museum of Modern Art MOMA) in New York City. Beth David Synagogue in Binghamton NY (1963) was often seen as a significant synthesis of Wright and Le Corbusier although it was derived from the preliminary sketches for the Villa Shodhan by Le Corbusier.

Seligmann also published numerous articles on the work of Frank Lloyd Wright, Le Corbusier, and modern architecture in general.

=== Professional activities ===
- Juror, International Competition for Campione, Italy 1984
- Professional Advisor, N.I.A.E. Van Allen Competition 1984–85
- Participant, Symposium, "The Rise of Modernism", Syracuse University 1984
- Participant, Symposium "Woche der Verbrannten Bucher", University of Osnabruck, Germany 1983
- Member, Team Leader, Chicago World's Fair Charette, Chicago 1983
- Miami University, Team Leader, Charette, Dayton, Ohio 1982
- Chairman, Juror, A.I.A., N.Y.S., Honor Awards Jury 1982
- Chairman, Juror, A.I.A., Honor Awards Jury, Puerto Rico 1981
- Participant, Symposium on Palladio, Syracuse University 1980
- Juror, Skidmore Owings and Merrill Annual Traveling Competition
- Juror, A.I.A., N.Y.S. Honor Awards Jury 1979
- Participant, Symposium on Le Corbusier, Syracuse University 1979
- Juror, Progressive Architecture Awards Program 1978
- Participant, Symposium "The Future Roles of Professionals in the Built Environment:", Harvard University 1975
- Participant, Symposium "Public Policy and the Built Environment", Harvard University 1974

=== Significant built works ===
- Bradley House, Corning NY, 1955
- Miller Summer House addition, Skaneateles Lake, 1964
- Beth David Synagogue, Binghamton NY, 1963
- Science Building II, Cortland State University, Cortland NY, 1967
- Sproull Summer House, Cayuga Lake, 1967. Demolished
- Temple Brith Sholom, Cortland NY, 1969
- McDermott Hall, Camp Huntington, Raquette Lake NY, 1970
- Willard State Hospital Administration Building, Willard NY, 1971
- Ithaca Scattered Site Housing (now Elm Street and Maple Avenue), Ithaca NY, 1973
- Olean Central Fire Station, Olean NY, 1980
- Ithaca Commons Center (now Center Ithaca), Ithaca NY, 1981

=== Significant urban design works ===
- Buffalo Waterfront Urban Design Study, done by the Cornell Graduate Studio with Colin Rowe and Jerry A. Wells, 1965–66
- Binghamton Urban Renewal, Binghamton NY, 1966–1974
- Architectural Competition - Professional Advisor: organization of competition, programming, administration
- Buffalo, New York "Buffalo: Waterfront", Urban Design Study Cornell University, Urban Design Graduate Program critics: Colin Rowe, Werner Seligmann, J Alan Wells, with students Richard Baiter, Richard Cardwell, David Chan, Wayne Copper, Harris Forusz, Alfred Koetter, Makoto Miki, Elipidio Olympio, Frans Oswald. 1965–66, Exhibited Albright-Knox Art Gallery, Buffalo New York, Jun 23-September 1, 1969

=== Significant competition entries ===
- Beauborg Arts Center (later Centre Georges Pompideiu), Paris, France, 1971
- Ft Lauderdale Riverfront Plaza, Ft Lauderdale, Florida, 1983
- Opera de la Bastille, Paris, France, 1983
- Prinz-Albrecht-Palais Park, Berlin, Germany, 1984
- Arizona Historical Society Museum, Phoenix, Arizona, 1985
- XVII Triennale di Milano Exhibition, Milan, Italy, Invited Competition, 1988
- Tokyo International Forum, Tokyo, Japan, 1989
- Topography of Terror, Berlin, Germany, 1993
- Cardiff Bay Opera House, Cardiff, Wales, 1994
- Felix Nussbaum House, Osnabrück, Germany, 1994

=== Guest lecturer ===
Graham Foundation; Temple University; Rhode Island School of Design; University of Venice; University of Rome; Rice University; University of Houston; University of Kansas; University of Texas at Arlington; University of Illinois, Chicago; University of Puerto Rico; Institute for Architecture and Urban Studies, New York; University of Notre Dame in Rome; Harvard University; Massachusetts Institute of Technology; Princeton University; Cornell University; Syracuse University; Washington University in St. Louis; University of Southern California; University of California at Los Angeles; Hampton University; Iowa State University; University of Virginia; Virginia Polytechnic Institute; University of Houston; Carnegie-Mellon University; Cooper Union; SUNY Buffalo, Binghamton University; Rensselaer Polytechnic Institute; Brandeis University; New Jersey Institute of Technology; Osnabrück University.

=== Guest juror ===
Harvard University; Columbia University; Yale University; Princeton University; Rhode Island School of Design, Cornell University; Iowa State University; Boston Architectural College; Washington University in St. Louis; Architectural Association, London; Polytechnic of Central London, London; University of Greenwich, London; Institute for Architecture and Urban Studies, New York; Rensselaer Polytechnic Institute; Eigenoessische Technische Hochschule, Zürich; University of Stuttgart; University of Virginia; University of Toronto.

== Bibliography ==
- Coleman, Bruce M., author, Richard R. Bosch, co-author/editor, Mark Shapiro, Kristen Schaffer, Val Werke, Bruce Lonnman, Marleen Davis, and Alan Chimacoff, contributing authors. Werner Seligmann: The Poetics of Architecture and Space. n.p.: Mythical Publishing, 2025.
- Seligmann, Werner. "The Work of Le Corbusier as Lessons for the Student of Architecture." Included in a publication of the Harvard Le Corbusier Rencontre. 1997
- Seligmann, Werner. "Le Corbusier - The Four Compositions." Festschrift for Prof. Eduard Sekler - Harvard University. 1997
- Contribution to The Texas Rangers. Alexander Caragonne. The M.I.T. Press. 1995
- Seligmann, Werner. "The Evolution of the Prairie House." Article in Frank Lloyd Wright, A Primer on Architectural Principles. Ed. Robert McCarter. New York: Princeton Architectural Press, 1990.
- "The Texas Years and the Beginning at the E.T.H. 1956-61."Article in Architektur Lehren. Zürich: G.T.A. 1989
- Seligmann, Werner. "Le Corbusier As Architectural Engineer," Architectural Record. October 1987, pp. 142.151. 1987
- Seligmann, Werner. "The Poetics of Counterpoint." Article in catalog Mario Campi, Franco Pessina, Architects. New York: Rizzoli International Publications, 1987.
- Seligmann, Werner. "Swiss Precision," Boni House by Mario Camp, House and Garden. pp. 180–187. October. 1986
- Seligmann, Werner. "Schirn am Romerberg Frankfurt am Main." Lead article for a catalog published for the opening of the new cultural center in Frankfurt, Germany. 1986
- Seligmann, Werner. "The Role of Design in the Profitable Architectural Office." Keynote Address. The A.I.A. Press. 1985
- Architecture & Urbanism Japan, Various projects and buildings 1984
- Toshi-Jutaku, Elm Street Housing, Ithaca, NY 1983
- Seligmann, Werner. "Campi Pessina Piazzoli (Critique)," Progressive Architecture. pp. 70–71. July. 1982
- Progressive Architecture (Cover) Center Ithaca, Ithaca, New York, July 1982
- "A Fitting Image?" Progressive Architecture. Olean Central Fire Station, Olean, NY, pp. 66–69 + cover. July. 1980
- Lavenstein, Richard. Contemporary Architects, St. Martin's Reference Books. 1980
- Seligmann, Werner. Documentation of Buildings by Le Corbusier. Oppositions 15/16. 1979
- Seligmann, Werner. U.D.C. Housing, Ithaca, New York, Catalog of Kajima Institute. 1978
- Toshi-Jutaku. U.D.C. Housing, Ithaca, New York 1978
- Seligmann, Werner. "Runcorn Historical Precedent and Rationale Design Process." In collaboration with Anthony Vidler. Oppositions 7. 1976–77
- Architecture & Urbanism Japan, Science Building II, SUNY College at Cortland, Willard State Hospital Administration Building. December. 1976
- Seligmann, Werner. Binghamton Capri Theater Impact Study, published by the Valley Development Foundation, Binghamton NY 1976
- Architecture & Urbanism Japan - Willard State Hospital Administration Building, April issue (Cover) 1975
- L'Architecture d'Aujourd'hui France - Quarterly, U.D.C. Housing, Ithaca, New York 1975
- Seligmann, Werner. "Assessing Broadway East (Appraisal )," Progressive Architecture. pp. 62–67.October 1974
- Seligmann, Werner. U.D.C. Housing at Kingston, NY; "Assessing Broadway East", an appraisal by Werner Seligmann, Progressive Architecture October 1974
- Seligmann, Werner. Low-rise Housing by John Macsai Published by John Wiley, Inc. 1974
- U.D.C. Housing, Ithaca, New York, Oppositions 3 May 1974
- JOH/9 Journal of Housing No. 9 U.D.C. Housing, Ithaca, New York, October 1974
- American Home, U.D.C. Housing, Ithaca, New York, September, 1974
- Architecture & Urbanism Japan, U.D.C. Housing, Ithaca, New York, June–July, 1974
- Empire State Architect, "Homes for Better Living Awards", U.D.C. Housing, Ithaca, New York, June 1974
- House and Home, “Homes for Better Living Awards”, U.D.C. Housing, Ithaca, New York, May 1974
- A.I.A. Journal, U.D.C. Housing, Ithaca, New York, 1974
- Progressive Architecture, U.D.C. Housing, Ithaca, New York, May, 1973
- Architectural Record, U.D.C. Housing, Ithaca, New York, April, 1971
- Final Report, Broome County Cultural Center Competition, April 1971
- Architectural Forum, Rehabilitation Center, Willard State Hospital, Willard, New York, December, 1970
- "Another Chance for Cities", U.D.C. Housing, Ithaca New York, published by Whitney Museum of American Art, New York, 1970
- Seligmann, Werner. U.D.C Ithaca Scattered Site Housing Project report 1969
- Progressive Architecture, Beth David Synagogue, Binghamton, New York, March, 1968
- 40 American architects under 40, published by Architectural League of New York, Beth David Synagogue, Binghamton, New York, 1968
- Seligmann, Werner. "Will Taste Finish Concrete?" Progressive Architecture. "Beauty is Truth, Truth is Beauty, That’s All," comments by Werner Seligmann, pp. 184–186. October 1966
- Progressive architecture, Design Awards Issue, Beth David Synagogue, Binghamton, New York, January 1963
- American Synagogue Architecture, published by the Jewish Museum of New York, Beth David Synagogue, 1963
