= Texas Rangers (architects) =

Architects who taught at the University of Texas School of Architecture

In architecture, Texas Rangers refers to a group of architects who taught at the University of Texas School of Architecture in Austin, Texas, from 1951 to 1958. The group is known for the development of an innovative curriculum that encouraged the development of a workable, useful body of architectural theory derived from a continuous critique of significant works across history and cultures. The curriculum discouraged the sculpting and shaping of a building's mass in favor of the visualization and organization of architectural space.

== History ==
The movement that brought about the Texas Rangers began with the appointment of Harwell Hamilton Harris as the first director of the school in 1951. Harris, impressed by a new approach to design championed by the former Bauhaus member, Josef Albers, began recruiting architects to teach at his school whose approach to design and architecture were similar to Albers’. Among those Harris succeeded in attracting to the Texas School of Architecture were Colin Rowe, John Hejduk, Robert Slutzky, Werner Seligmann, Lee Hirsche, Bernhard Hoesli, Lee Hodgden, Irwin Rubin, Jerry Wells, John Shaw, and W. Irving Phillips, Jr.
