= Diane Lewis (architect) =

American architect, author and academic

Diane Lewis (1951 – May 2, 2017) was an American architect, author and academic.

== Biography ==
Lewis received her bachelor's degree in architecture from Cooper Union in 1976. In 1977, Lewis was awarded the Rome Prize in architecture. Following her achievement, she was employed at Richard Meier's office from 1977–78, followed by six years at I.M. Pei and Partners from 1978–83. Her mentor was the architect John Hejduk.

In 1993 she became the first female architect to be appointed to the full-time faculty at Cooper Union. She also taught at other colleges and universities including Yale University, the University of Virginia, and the University of Toronto, where in 2006 she was the "Frank Gehry visiting chair". She was a professor at the Chair for Design and Interior Planning, Faculty of Architecture at the Technical University of Berlin 1999-2001.

In 2006 Lewis received the John Q. Hejduk award from The Cooper Union Alumni Association and in 2008 the Smithsonian's Cooper Hewitt National Design Award.

Lewis's built work was limited mostly to interior design most notably the "studiolo" she created for her fellow architects Mark Wigley and Beatriz Colomina.

Lewis was the author of numerous books, including; "Diane Lewis: Inside Out: Architecture New York City" (Charta 2006) which also incorporates contributions by the architects Richard Meier and Anthony Vidler as well as the historian Daniel Sherer and the artist Carl Andre co.
