= Bernhard Hoesli =

Bernhard Hoesli (1923–1984) was a Swiss architect and collage artist.

== Early age ==
Hoesli was born in Glarus, Switzerland from a German-Swiss father and a French mother. He later moved at an early age with his family to live in Zürich. After graduating from high school with a mathematics degree he joined ETH Zurich where he obtained a degree in architecture in 1944.

== Career ==
In 1947 Hoesli moved to Paris, France to join architect Fernand Léger's team and later was accepted by Le Corbusier as an assistant. In 1948 he was sent to La Plata, Argentina to supervise the construction of the Curutchet House. A year later, he was appointed to take charge of the Unité d'Habitation project in Marseille.

=== The Texas Rangers ===
Hoesli moved to the United States in 1951. He first joined the School of Architecture at the University of Texas at Austin as a professor of architecture. It was there where he was joined by architects Colin Rowe, John Hejduk and Werner Seligmann among others to form the Texas Rangers group of architects. He then returned to teach at ETH Zurich.

=== Teaching at the ETH Zurich ===
In 1959, which Hoesli hails as the year Modern Architecture became teachable worldwide, many opinions on architectural instruction changed. In that year, the year of the death of Frank Lloyd Wright, his Guggenheim museum was completed, as were the Birmingham Museum of Art and the Sidney Myer Music Bowl. At this point, Hoesli felt free to discuss the procedure of design with students through pedagogy. His design problems, which "were so formulated that the student had to solve tasks within a given framework of requirements and achieve precise results", were arranged by types. The types of problems were created in order to instruct the students in a specific skill through their own self-discovery with trial and error. Hoesli relates this process to the Socratic method, in which students are constantly faced with important questions and debates. When Hoesli began teaching architecture at the ETH in 1959, some of his duties included “looking after” fifth-year students. At this point, Hoesli realized that most of the fifth-years had an understanding of design as being dependent upon a flash of inspiration rather than a building of design steps upon each other. These students completed projects that had no room for growth or adaptation, and they would not accept criticism or suggestions for improvement. Hoesli felt that this approach was counterproductive and set about changing the way the entire curriculum was structured. Also at the time Hoesli began teaching at the ETH, the design process revolved around different building types. Students would complete an assignment from a specific building group. "Design began with a garden house, then continued with a holiday home, family dwelling, then on to a multi-family dwelling, then on to a multi-storey block, school building and shopping centre, until at the end of the studies a church or theatre was ventured upon."

Of the contrary opinion, Hoesli believed that steps of design were more important than mere function. He saw transparency and wise space definition as the ultimate goals for architectural work. "Transparency," Hoesli wrote, "frees us, because we allow it, to see buildings and structures in connections and independent of the differences between 'historical' and 'modern'." He also articulated that transparency as referenced with the modern tradition became an important tool for instruction in the schools of architecture throughout the world.

Further, Hoesli felt that students should have the opportunity to branch out in creativity through a more structured process than was present at the ETH. He felt the structure of the ETH curriculum at the time was too dependent on chance and the fleeting feelings of a fine art mentality rather than a practical design process.

After his University of Texas experience, Hoesli's leadership skills and persuasive discussions were at their peak. He was able to formulate new course structures and implement them with ease. He also possessed the wherewithal and energy to pursue the course of action he saw as best for the schools.

At the time Hoesli decided to alter the ETH"s pedagogy, he was delighted to discover a common Modern manifesto arising as society pronounced Modern architecture dead. He stated, "In order that the Architecture Department of the ETH can reach the standard of international architectural development, the introduction into architectural design had to be consciously and systematically based on Modern Architecture and the work of its protagonists." He saw the three main protagonists as Frank Lloyd Wright, Le Corbusier, and Mies van der Rohe. His obsession with the Modernist tradition led him to defend it after it became passe and the public pronounced it dead. He suggested that not only did students need to survive the Modern movement, but embrace it as history. He also felt that the Cubist and De Stijl painters had similar perceptions of the continuity of space and drew inspiration from them. He commented profusely on the Modernist concept of continuous space in both writings and lectures regarding his three protagonists as well as many others. He used Modernism as a source of history and theory for his lessons.

"First", it is written of his changes in the ETH, "it was decided what should be taught. Then, from this, situations and programmes were formulated. The student sees himself confronted by a problem. He deals with it, makes his own experiences, and on the basis of a review of the theme in the lecture and discussion, it is possible for him, at the same time, to understand what he has experienced."

==== The Basic Design course ====
Hoesli began his curriculum overhaul with the basic design course. In his opinion, "the basic course should allow for the architecturally still "unskilled" people to recognize: what an architectural idea is; how it results, how it can be drawn out; upon what it is based; and how it can be developed, treated." This theory was put into action with several design exercises. One in the first semester involved extensive writing on the subject of the design concurrent with its first conceived sketches. This project involved first describing the everyday functions of the space to be designed, along with space requirements and basic diagrams. This was based on Hoesli's obsession with space. He stated as the first point of knowledge for architects, "The architect creates space." The students for this project started with a vague concept and explored avenues through which to improve their ideas as each step progressed. The openness of this first design step allowed for much more learning than the previous structure, as students were not as conceptually attached to a particular building before all the kinks in its design had been resolved. In short, "the first spatial organization is tested against the requirements and developed further…. The design is, above all, a spatial organization."

Hoesli taught new definitions of space as a continuous function. One key project in the first semester demonstrating this concept was called 'space within space.' Students were to design a space that was "defined without indicating and above or below." The point of this exercise was to separate function from design; a surface or a defining of space was not necessarily a floor or a ceiling or a wall- those titles are added by people. He based this assignment off a quote by Le Corbusier that includes the phrase "the floor that is a horizontal wall." This exercise, similar to the way many sculpture classes are taught, required that the finished product be equally viable from all sides. It could not contain a top or bottom or any other defining characteristic. This project, with so few but such stringent guidelines, challenged students to think about space in a different way. They also considered their materials in different ways, as many students attempted this exercise with many different media. They then faced the task of refining their materials to match their ideas or vice versa, another key concept Hoesli aimed for. The project also encouraged a great variety in creativity as students sought to execute the concept as thoroughly as possible. Students were encouraged to complete as much of the first step as possible independently in order to allow this creativity. In the second phase of this problem, which happened in the winter semester, students worked with advising groups together. They continued this exploration, defining the space within the space. They put the space they had created into another space, a cube, giving it a context of reference. Hoesli enforced his concept of 'geometry as image' during these space- exploring assignments. This, along with his preoccupation with collaging of materials in a geometric manner, was clearly communicated to the students based on their final products.

Another assignment during the first semester was the 'Extension to a House' project. Hoesli was interested in communicating that not every architectural creation needed to be a freestanding object, but that architecture involved working with the space that already existed- be it an empty lot or a pre-existing structure.

In this project, the students followed three concise steps. They first analyzed the existing structure, generally a home built by one of Hoesli's Texas Ranger friends. They analyzed both form and function of every part of the existing building, strengthening skills in drawing as well as proportion and geometry. They next did sketches and ideas for their proposed solutions to the problem and worked through these with help from faculty. They discussed the pros and cons of each idea they had before deciding on a final plan. The third step was actual work on the project, including material decision-making and discussions on how to integrate the new addition into the old structure both aesthetically and physically. This assignment also reinforced Hoesli's idea of working in steps and allowing revising to take a role in the creative process.

During the second year, students had the clubhouse assignment. They were to create a set of buildings- a clubhouse, an airplane hangar, and a workshop that worked together as a group without necessarily touching. The intent of this exercise was to teach yet more process, involving organization, site evaluation, architectural themes, construction and form, as well as practical presentation skills.

Another second-year project was known as the pottery. Students were faced with a much more difficult space to address: one in an existing urban environment. This meant that street space and a house on the lot would interact significantly with the structure they designed, including even a common courtyard-type exchange between the two structures. The location as well as function was specified for students: the building was to be a pottery business, including a shop and a studio. The process again went through many steps and revisions in order to reach its final outcome.

==== Career changes ====
In 1969, Hoesli was appointed Chairman of the architecture school. Unfortunately for him, this coincided with some serious political unrest both in Switzerland as a whole and within the university. He had a very difficult time adapting to the changes within the student body and their demeanor. His old methods of teaching from Texas and his prior ETH career didn't seem to work with the skeptical new generation. At this point, Hoesli realized he'd rather spend time working with students in the higher level classes who had already decided on their goals as architects. He left his first year courses in the same design and focused on the later year studios. He, along with Paul Hofer and Adolph Max Vogt, founded the Institute for the History and Theory of Architecture within the ETH and pronounced himself director. This allowed him to work with only the most elite students.

After Hoesli questioned the third and fourth year design class practices he’d seen from other faculty, he made the decision to teach the third year design course with Paul Hofer. After the two collaborated on the course curriculum for that first year (1978/1979) Hoesli took over the design course. The course for the third and fourth year was not divided into semester work, but rather consisted of a single project for those years. This project, called the Venice Project, was a housing unit for an urban setting, specifically the Cannaregio district in Venice, and contained six sections in its program.

==== The Venice project ====
The first step discussed the idea of a city as a working unit. In this step, students worked in clay to create massing models in order to understand the various interactions within volumetric shapes. They also attended related lectures. In the next step students analyzed different types of dwellings. Criteria for this analysis include size, layout in space, variation options, and so on. They refine the ideas in the clay designs they created.

The third step, related to the second, deals with using the analyses of step two in order to create a structure that relates to the architecture around it. The knowledge of the architecture of the area informs the ideas students originally had and gives more structure to their ideas. Natural lighting becomes a factor. The students learned about a typical layout in a Venetian town, including even the piazza with the church, and altered their designs accordingly.

The fourth step refers specifically to the student's design and the important relationship between the inside and outside of the building. Students decide on a theme for their final designs as they address the transition from inside to outside space. This relates back to the very first assignment regarding the shaping and defining of space- continuous space rather than an inside versus an outside.

The next step seems quite difficult. Students must turn their ideas of spatial understandings for their plans into volumetric shapes; i.e. they must turn volume into mass. They did, in essence, a figure-ground reversal. This served to ensure that every space in the final design was active and engaging. As a basis for this step, Hoesli used the observation that Le Corbusier’s Unite seemed like a volumetric explanation for the space in the Uffizi.

The final step was to design the scale models of their housing project, involving all the previous steps in their final designs.

What is considered the seventh step in the process is actually the selection of a new project for the following semesters. The students work together with faculty juries in order to select the goals for this project. The project is chosen as a general urban section that each student can contribute to in an individualized manner. They divide up sections of the area and provide solutions to the individual problems they present themselves with. In this way, students were able to become fully involved in the process while retaining a respect for a larger picture.

During the designing process, students were presented with lectures and instruction on common Venetian facades and asked to incorporate this information into their designs. This consisted the eighth step.

The ninth step was the final submission of the design.

The obsession with space and transparency continued throughout Hoesli's teaching career. He commented, "Transparency arises wherever there are locations in space which can be assigned two or more systems of reference—where the classification is undefined and the choice between one classification possibility or another remains open."

=== Death ===
Hoesli's unexpected death in 1984 was a shock to students and faculty. They remember him as an extremely influential figure in the shaping of the ETH architecture school as well as in their personal lives and thought patterns.
