= Wall House II =

House designed by John Hejduk in Groningen, the Netherlands

Coordinates: 53.1831°N 6.5530°E

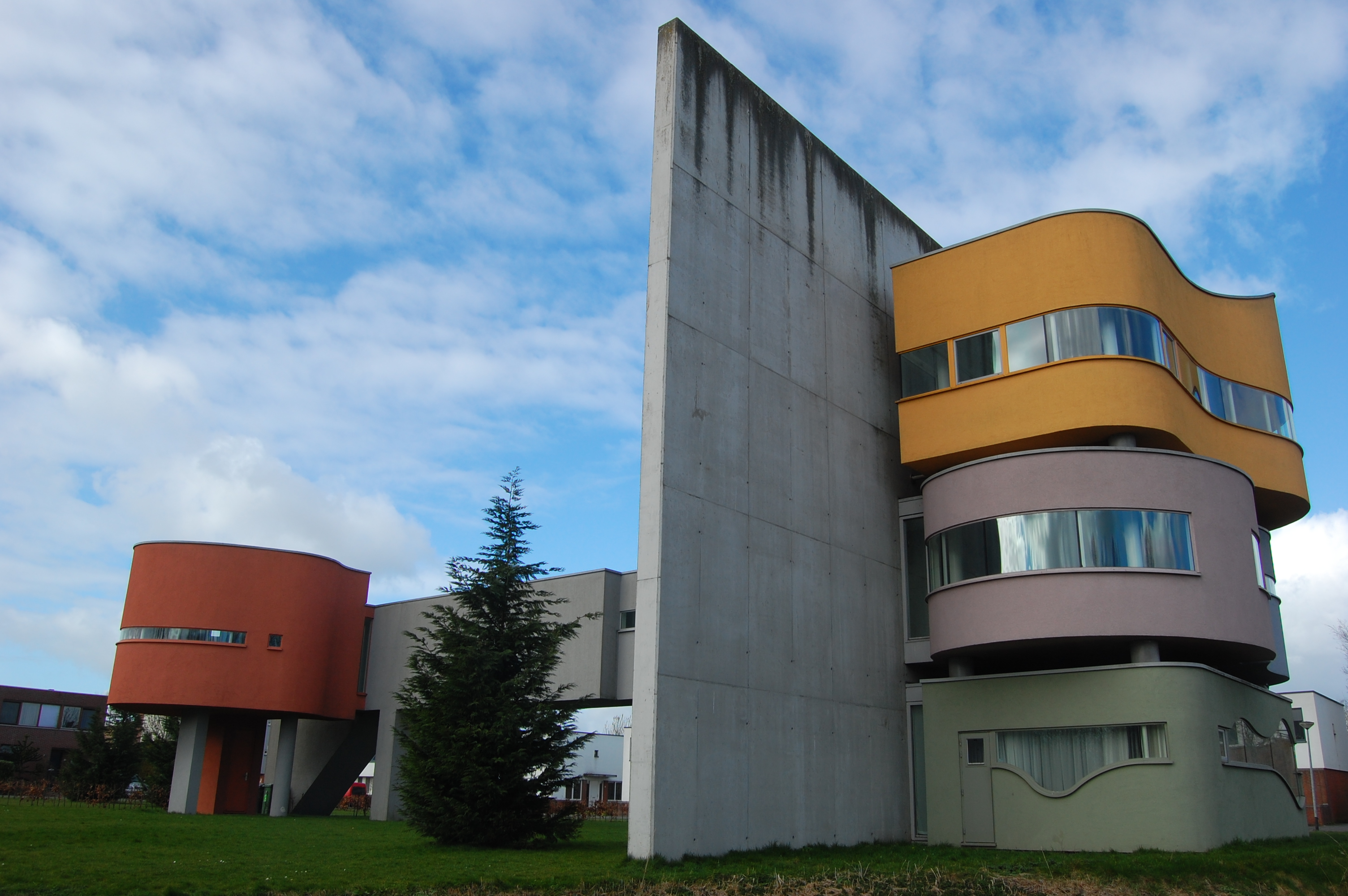
The Wall House II

Bye House (also known as Wall House II) is a historic building in Groningen, Netherlands, that was designed by John Hejduk. It is one of his few realized designs.

Hejduk originally designed Wall House II as a residence to be built in Ridgefield, Connecticut. However, due to cost constraints, the project was abandoned. In 2000, a Dutch development company, Wilma, started building the house in Groningen, based on Hejduk's original design and later revisions.

Wall House II has a very large wall as its central feature, composed of four organic-formed rooms and a long, narrow corridor. It is considered a mix of Cubist painting, Surrealist sculpture and architecture.

== The building ==
Wall House II was constructed in the Hoornse Meer neighborhood with a view across the Paterwoldse Meer. The wall and column are constructed of reinforced concrete. The corridor is steel-framed with wooden stud walls and a stucco exterior.

In discussing the wall section of Wall House II Hejduk stated:

“Life has to do with walls; we're continuously going in and out, back and forth, and through them. A wall is the quickest, the thinnest, the element we're always transgressing… The wall heightens the sense of passage, and by the same token, its thinness heightens the sense of being just a momentary condition…what I call the moment of the “present.”

Discussing the house colors, Hejduk referred to Le Corbusier’s La Roche House in Paris, stating:

“After that experience,” he says, “I could never do another white or primary-colored house.” In the La Roche house, the colors “were hardly apparent at first, but after you were there awhile you saw not only that they changed constantly, but that they were delicate and muted, and also saturated at the same time.”

== History ==
Hejduk originally designed Wall house II in 1973 (the first was done in 1968) for landscape architect A.E. Bye. Hejduk was an architect, artist and educator who later became Dean of the Irwin S. Chanin School of Architecture at Cooper Union. Bye was a fellow faculty member at Cooper Union. Due to the high estimated costs of construction in the wooded area, Wall House II was put on hold. it was proposed to other clients, but was never started.

In 1990 the Wall house II project was introduced in Groningen on behalf of the experiment “Making the City Boundaries”. On the basis of Daniel Libeskind’s masterplan, people from various disciplines were asked to design signposts along the city’s most important arterial roads, telling the story of Groningen. Libeskind was a former student of Heiduk.

Wall House II was realized through the efforts of Niek Verdonk, Groningen’s director of city planning, and Olof van de Wal, the head of Platform Gras, a city-sponsored architectural group. For 11 years, Verdonk and Van de Wal worked to develop Wall House II. Eventually, the Wilma BV Developers and Kamminga estate agents agreed to build the house and sell it.

The Berlin architect Thomas Muller, a former student at Cooper Union, was appointed project architect. He was then working in Groningen under supervision of Kleihues. Due to building codes and construction techniques-which required, for example, leaving space between the wall and rooms for hand plastering-the house was enlarged from its original size, to 2500 square feet. Muller redrew the plans with Derk Flikkema of Otonomo Architects in Groningen, with Hejduk reviewing the drawings in each phase up until his death.

The construction cost was $600,000 in total, and it was sold with a proviso that the public can visit it one month a year.
