= Kreuzberg Tower and Wings =

Building complex in Berlin, Germany

Coordinates: 52°30′18″N 13°23′32″E

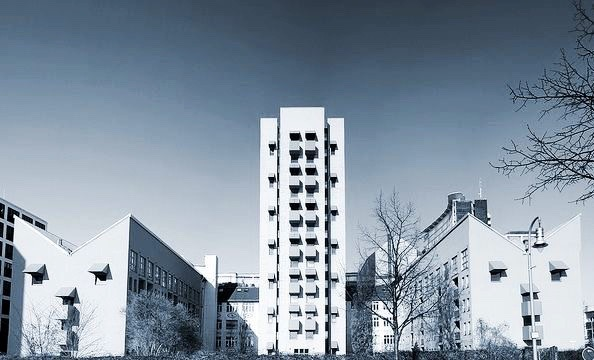
Kreuzberg Tower, Berlin. October 2013

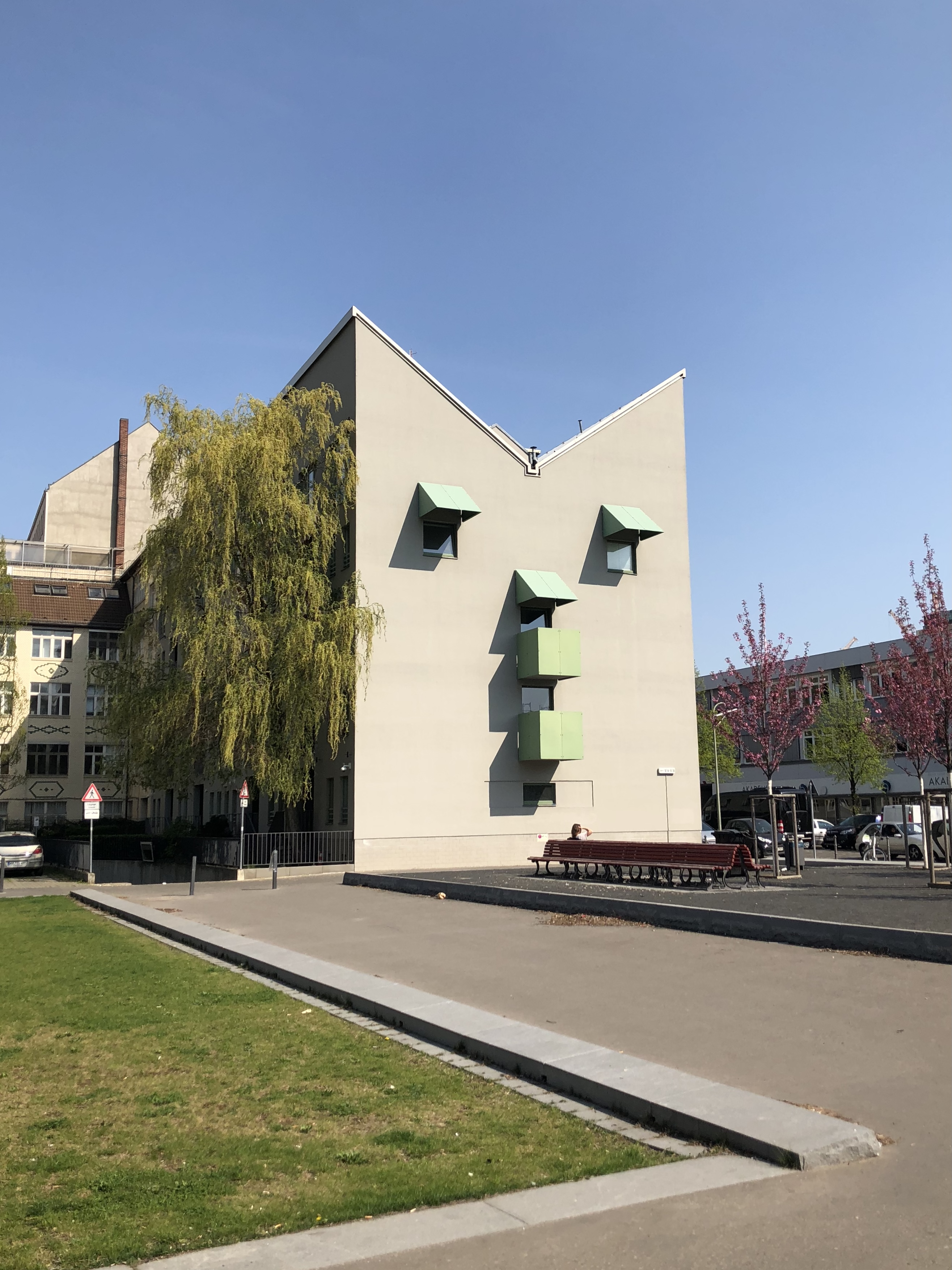
Kreuzberg tower wing, 2018

The Kreuzberg Tower and Wings are a complex of three buildings, designed by the American architect John Hejduk. Located close to Checkpoint Charlie, the project was completed in 1988, shortly before the Berlin Wall came down in 1989. It is considered an iconic work of 20th-century architecture, and one of very few that Hejduk realised during his lifetime.

== History ==
In 1979, International Building Exhibition Berlin — known as "IBA" in German — was initiated. Focused on a shortage of social housing in West Berlin, it became the largest urban renewal effort in Europe at the time. One of the inner city areas chosen for redevelopment was the southern Friedrichstadt quarter. Hejduk submitted an urban design plan for a competition held in 1981. Whilst he did not win, the director of IBA Neubau (New Buildings), Josef Paul Kleihues, was impressed by Hejduk's ideas and invited him to propose a building project for an empty plot — number 11 — between Kochstrasse and Charlottenstrasse (in additional to two other plots, in Tegel and on Friedrichstrasse). The initial brief included two low-level residential blocks that were scaled to the neighbouring historic buildings. In addition, Hejduk was asked to design a residency for The DAAD Artists-in-Berlin Program.

At this point in time, Hejduk was best known as the Dean of the Cooper Union School of Architecture in New York, and as an architect whose output mostly consisted of poetry, drawings, and publications. The critic Herbert Muschamp described him in the New York Times as:

"the consummate paper architect, an artist who has shirked off the cumbersome apparatus of conventional practice and created entire cities of the mind. His drawings, often gathered together in the form of 'masques,' set forth an elaborate personal mythology of angels, medusas, watchtowers, condemned men and other allegorical figures. In these cerebral cityscapes, buildings often resemble costumed performers. They act out the idea that architecture can be as solitary a pursuit as poetry or painting."

Together with Cooper Union graduate Moritz Müller as contact architect in Berlin, Hedjuk worked on the designs between 1984-87. Upon completion, the DAAD Artists-in-Berlin Program did not move into the tower. Instead, all 55 apartments across the three buildings were given over to social housing, in what was, at the time, a largely Turkish Gastarbeiter demographic in Kreuzberg.

== Design Features ==
The Kreuzberg Tower consists of five independent towers interconnected by internal and external walkways: the towers are square, rectangular and circular in plan. There are a total of seven apartments, each with two floors, making a total of 14 storeys. The largest of these towers comprises living area on the lower level and a loft-type artist's studio on the upper level. Services such as elevator, fire stairs, kitchens, bathrooms and bedrooms occupy the rest of the towers. According to Derek Fraser, "The Braque inspired palette of grey, black and green... conveys an aura of melancholy." The Wings are recognisable by their anthropomorphic, south-facing façades, which bear a resemblance to simplified faces. Two other Hejduk designed constructions — entitled House of the Painter and House of the Musician — were originally intended to stand in the courtyard area, but were never realised.

Residents of the Kreuzberg Tower have attested to its metaphysical properties. Robert Slinger, who lived on the 8th and 9th floors, wrote that:

"After living there for a further eight years, I came to understand how Hejduk’s architecture both flexibly accommodates and yet asserts a presence which resists any attempts to co-opt it. For me, this relationship was never adversarial, but rather more akin to a debate with an old friend, where differences of opinion are thrashed out over a given ground of mutual respect."

Shumon Basar, who has lived on the 10th and 11th floors, has written that:

"The luxury Hejduk offers is a radical rethinking of the plan of a house or an apartment. Its received principles of sense. He forces you to inhabit through invention."
