= John Hejduk =

American architect (1929–2000)

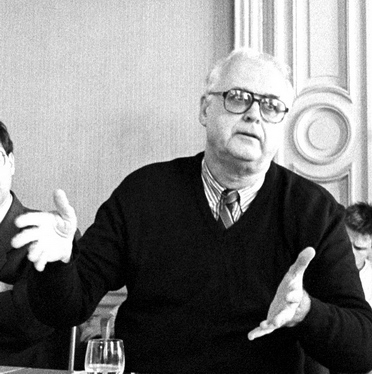
- Hejduk in 1991
- Born: John Quentin Hejduk; July 19, 1929; New York City, U.S.
- Died: July 3, 2000 (aged 70); New York City, U.S.
- Education: Cooper Union; University of Cincinnati; Harvard GSD
- Occupations: Architect, artist, educator
- Known for: One of the New York Five; Dean of the Irwin S. Chanin School of Architecture

John Quentin Hejduk (July 19, 1929 – July 3, 2000) was an American architect, artist and educator from New York City. Hejduk studied at the Cooper Union School of Art and Architecture, the University of Cincinnati, and the Harvard Graduate School of Design. He worked in several offices in New York including that of I. M. Pei and the office of A.M. Kinney. He established his own practice in New York City in 1965.

== Career ==
=== As a professor ===
Hejduk was hired at the University of Texas at Austin School of Architecture by Dean Harwell Hamilton Harris. During his time at the School, he was a member of the so-called "Texas Rangers", a group of influential professors which also included Colin Rowe, Robert Slutzky, Werner Seligmann, and Herbert Hirsche.

Following his time at UT Austin, Hejduk was a professor of architecture at The Cooper Union for the Advancement of Science and Art, School of Architecture from 1964 to 2000 and Dean of the School of Architecture from 1975 to 2000. His arrival, including the cooperation of many other influential professors (including Raimund Abraham, Ricardo Scofidio, Peter Eisenman, Charles Gwathmey, Diana Agrest, Diane Lewis, Elizabeth Diller, David Shapiro, and many others), transformed the practice and critical thought of architecture.

== Approach ==
His early work and curriculum grew from a set of exercises exploring cubes, grids, and frames, through an examination of square grids placed within diagonal containers set against an occasional curving wall, towards a series of experiments with flat planes and curved masses in various combinations and colors. He was awarded a grant from the Graham Foundation in 1967. Eventually, John Hejduk's "hard-line" modernist space-making exercises, heavily influenced by Frank Lloyd Wright and Ludwig Mies van der Rohe, moved away from his interests in favor of free-hand "figure/objects" influenced by mythology and spirituality, clearly expressing the nature of his poetry.

The architectural historian K. Michael Hays has described Hejduk's architecture as one of "Encounter", describing Hejduk's objects as seeming "impossibly, to be aware of us, to address us. And yet we see not the gratifying reflection of ourselves we had hoped for but another thing, looking back at us, watching us, placing us", articulating Hejduk's work from a post-modern Lacanian perspective as more "literary" than that of his peers.

== Legacy ==
Hejduk is associated with several schools, including the New York Five (with architects Peter Eisenman, Richard Meier, Michael Graves, and Charles Gwathmey) whose early works are described in Five Architects (1973), and the Texas Rangers, a group of innovative architects and professors at the University of Texas School of Architecture, Austin, whose other well-known participants include Colin Rowe and Werner Seligmann.

Contemporary theorists, researchers, and academics publishing work and research by and about John Hejduk include K. Michael Hays, Mark Linder, R.E. Somol, Anthony Vidler, Renata Hejduk, and Catherine Ingraham

A large portion of his work is archived at the Canadian Centre for Architecture in Montreal, Canada.

== Important buildings ==
- House For a Musician (1983)
- House of the Suicide and House of the Mother of the Suicide (Prague, monument installed 2016)
- Kreuzberg Tower and Wings (Berlin, Germany, 1988)
- House of the Quadruplets / House for two Brothers (Berlin, Tegel, 1988)
- Gate House (Berlin, 1991) for the IBA 87
- La Máscara de la Medusa (Buenos Aires, 1998)
- Wall House II (Groningen, 2001)
Important buildings of John Hejduk

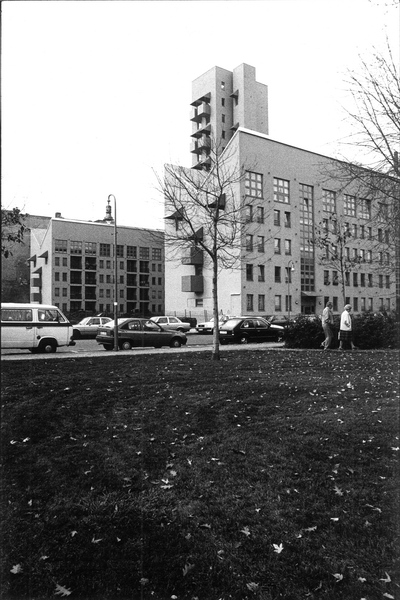
Kreuzberg Tower and Wings
(Berlin, Germany, 1988)

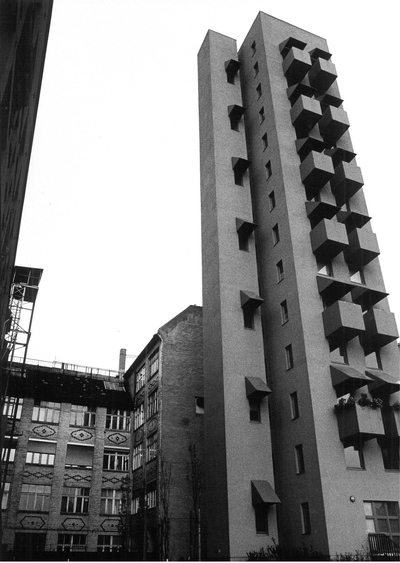
Kreuzberg Tower and Wings
(Berlin, Germany, 1988)

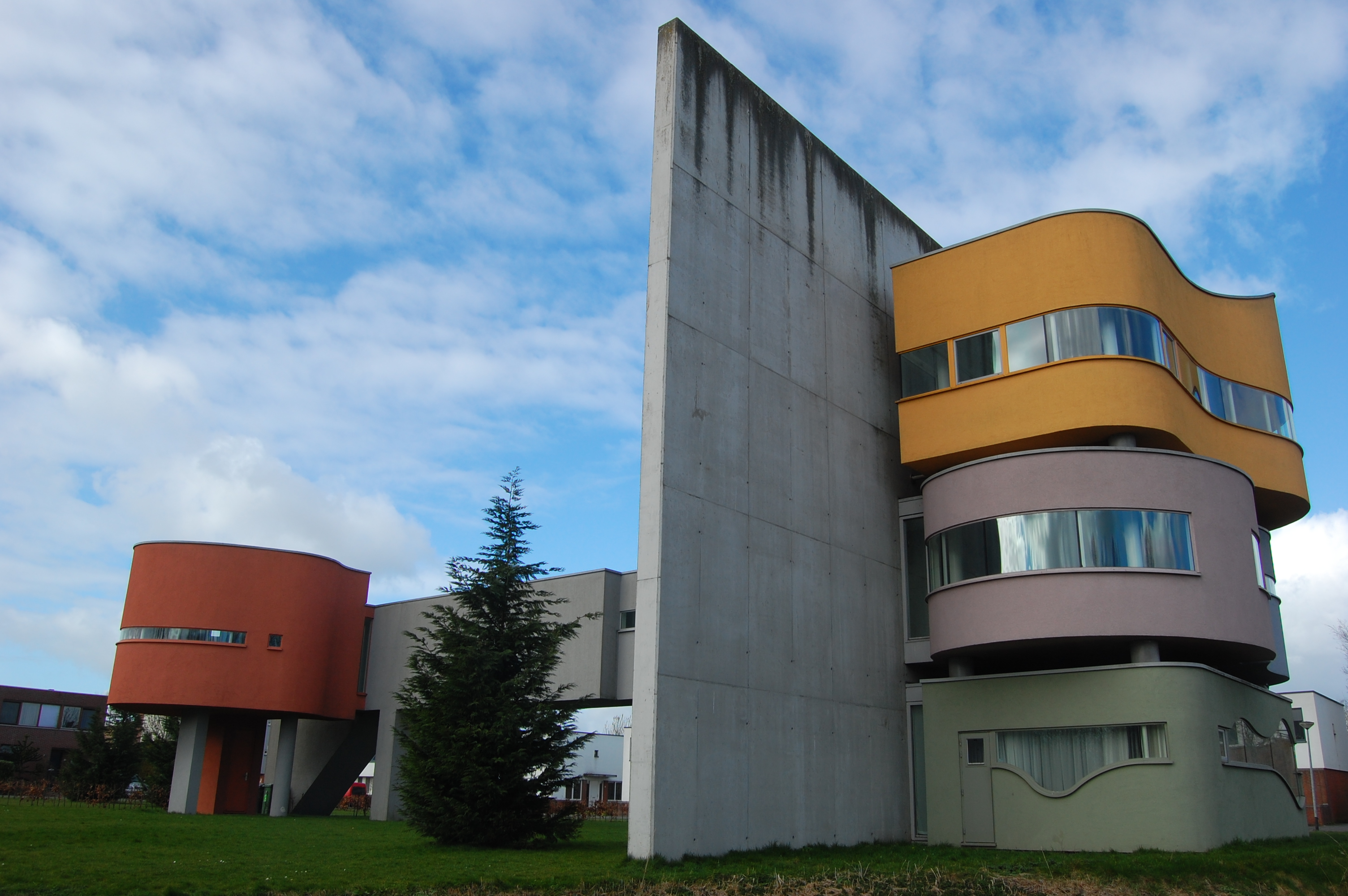
Wall House II
design from the 1970s, built posthumously (Groningen, The Netherlands, 2001)

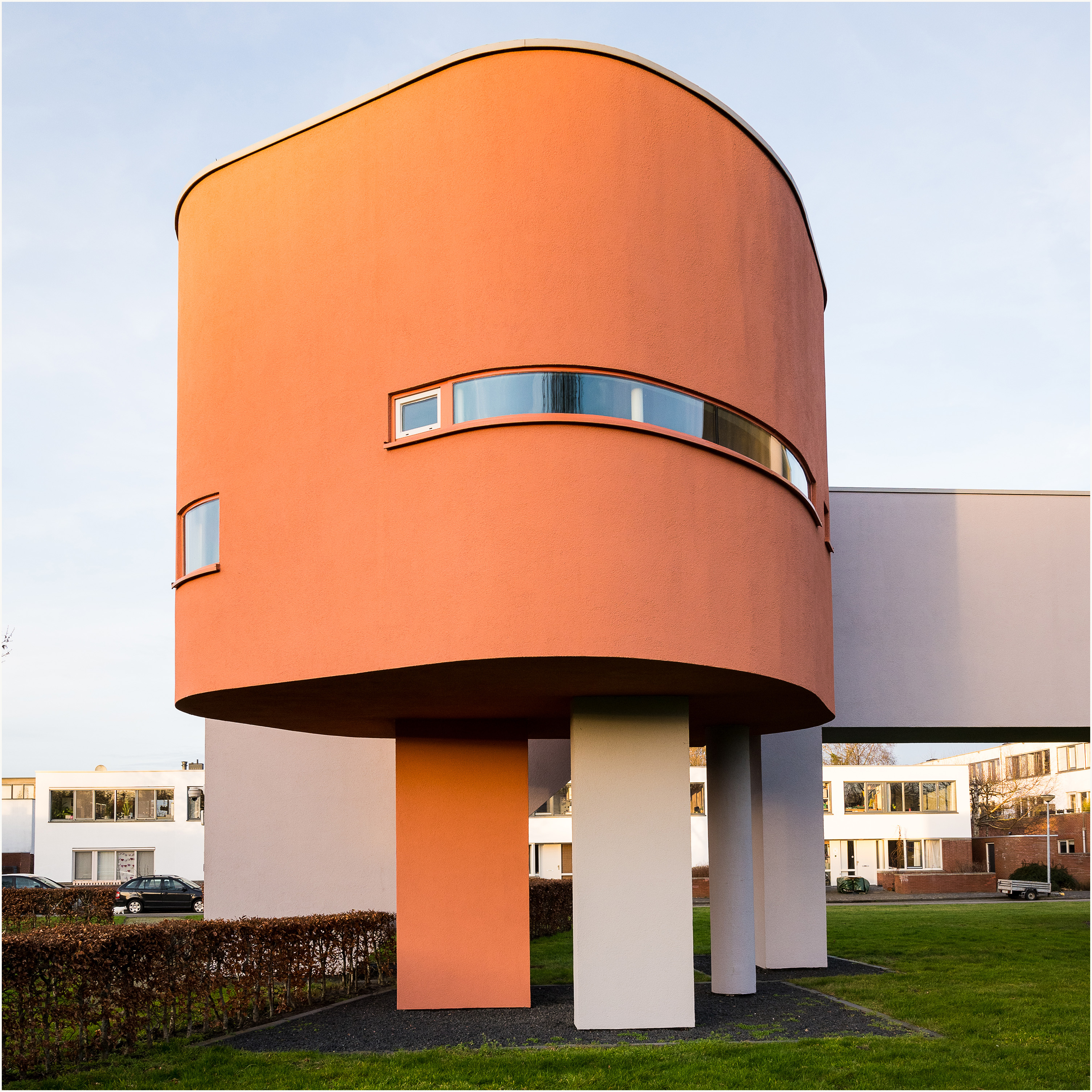
Wall House II (detail)

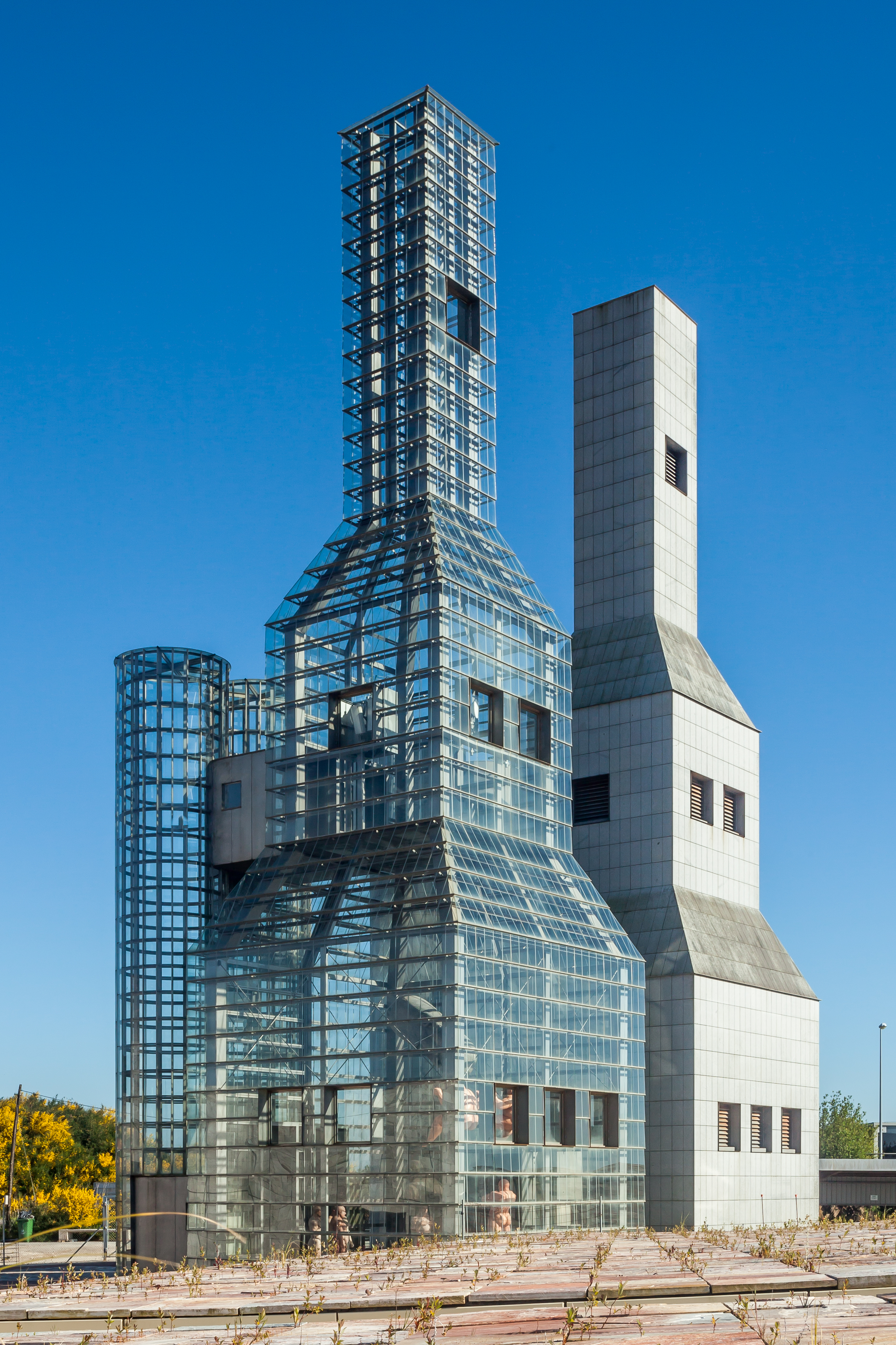
In Santiago de Compostela, Spain

=== The Rolling House ===
In 2019, students of the Faculty of Architecture of the Czech Technical University in Prague led by Hana Seho built the object The Rolling House according to drawings by John Hejduk. The project was created in the studio during the Summer School of Building on the topic of minimal mobile building. The realization took place in October and November 2019. The building was unveiled on November 11, 2019, as a celebration of the 30th anniversary of the Velvet Revolution and as a gift to Alena Šrámková for her 90th birthday.

== Conceptual works ==
- Diamond Houses (1962)
- Identity Card Man (Victim Series, 1986)
- Cemetery for the Ashes of Thought (1975)
- Berlin Masque (1981)
- Cathedral (1996)
- Chapel, Wedding of the Sun and Moon (1998)

== Bibliography ==
- Lines: No Fire Could Burn (1999)
- Education of an Architect a Point of View (1988, 1999)
- Pewter Wings Golden Horns Stone Veils: Wedding in a Dark Plum Room (1997)
- Adjusting Foundations (1995)
- Architectures in Love (1995)
- Security (1995)
- Berlin Night (1993)
- Soundings (1993)
- Aesop's Fables with Joseph Jacobs. Illustrations by John Hejduk. (1991)
- Práce (Practice) (1991)
- The Riga Project (1989)
- Vladivostok (1989)
- Bovisa (1987)
- Victims (1986)
- Mask of Medusa (1985)
- Fabrications (1974)
- Three Projects (1969)
