= Robert Slutzky =

American abstract painter and architectural theorist

- Born: November 27, 1929; Brooklyn, New York City, U.S.
- Died: May 3, 2005 (aged 75); Abington, Pennsylvania, U.S.
- Education: Cooper Union; Yale School of Art
- Occupations: Painter, architectural theorist
- Spouse: 2, including Joan Ockman
- Children: 1 daughter

Robert Slutzky (November 27, 1929 - May 3, 2005) was an American abstract painter and architectural theorist. He was the chair of the department of Fine Arts at the University of Pennsylvania, and a critic of the International Style. His paintings were exhibited in museums on the East Coast.

== Early life ==
Slutzky was born on November 27, 1929, in Brooklyn, New York City. He graduated from Cooper Union in 1951 and he attended Yale School of Art, where he earned a bachelor's degree in 1952 and a master's degree in 1954.

== Career ==
Slutzky began his career by teaching architectural theory at the University of Texas at Austin, where he worked with John Hejduk, Bernhard Hoesli and Colin Rowe. With the latter, Slutzky co-authored a collection of essays in which he criticized the International Style. Slutzky later taught at Cornell University and the Pratt Institute. From 1968 to 1990, he taught at his alma mater, Cooper Union. He taught in department of Fine Arts at the University of Pennsylvania from 1990 to 2005, where he served as the chair. He received the G. Holmes Perkins Award for Distinguished Teaching in 2001.

Slutzsky was also an abstract painter, with works exhibited at the Metropolitan Museum of Art, the Museum of Modern Art, the Boston Museum of Fine Arts, and held by the Whitney Museum and the Philadelphia Museum of Art.

== Personal life and death ==
Slutzky was married twice; his second wife, Joan Ockman, is an architectural historian and theorist that currently teaches at the University of Pennsylvania and Yale School of Architecture. Slutzky had a daughter, Zoe, and he resided in Elkins Park, Pennsylvania.

Slutzky died of amyotrophic lateral sclerosis on May 3, 2005, in Abington, Pennsylvania.

== Selected works ==
- Slutzky, Robert; Rowe, Colin (1997). Transparency: Literal and Phenomenal, Parts I and II. Basel: Birkhäuser. ISBN 978-0817656157. OCLC 645795787.
