= Colin Rowe =

British architectural historian

Colin Rowe (27 March 1920 – 5 November 1999) was a British-born, American-naturalised architectural historian, critic, theoretician and teacher. He is acknowledged to have been a major theoretical and critical influence in the second half of the twentieth century on world architecture and urbanism. During his life he taught briefly at the University of Texas at Austin and, for one year, at the University of Cambridge in England. For most of his life he was a professor at Cornell University in Ithaca, New York. Many of Rowe’s students became important architects and extended his influence throughout the architecture and planning professions. In 1995 he was awarded the Gold Medal by the Royal Institute of British Architects, its highest honor. He was also awarded the Athena Medal from the Congress for the New Urbanism posthumously in 2011.

== Early life ==
Colin Frederick Rowe was born in Rotherham, England in 1920 to Frederick W. Rowe and Helena Beaumount. Rowe's father was a schoolteacher. Their only other child, David, was born in October 1928. Colin won a scholarship to the local Grammar School and later attended the University of Liverpool to study architecture. He was called up for military service in December 1942 and was enlisted in the Royal Air Force. He badly injured his spine in a practice parachute jump and was hospitalized for more than six months. One of the first letters from Rowe published in The Letters of Colin Rowe: Five Decades of Correspondence was written from his hospital bed to his friend and colleague at the University Ursula Mercer.

== Theoretical approach ==
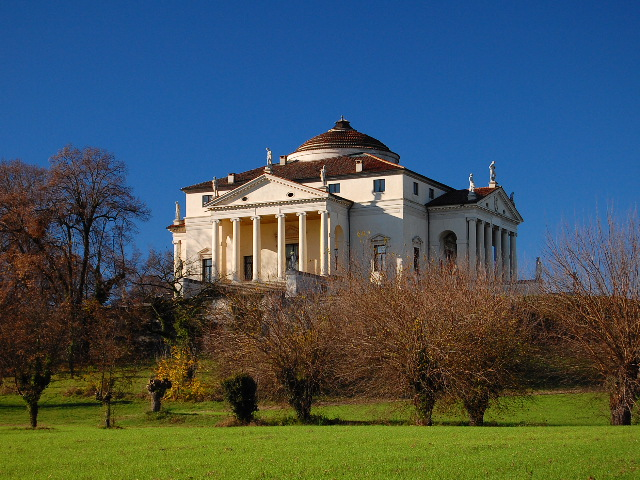
Villa Capra "La Rotonda" was compared directly by Colin Rowe to the "Villa Savoye" by Le Corbusier.

His 1945 MA thesis for Rudolf Wittkower at the Warburg Institute, London, was a theoretical speculation that Inigo Jones may have intended to publish a theoretical treatise on architecture, analogous to Palladio's Four Books of Architecture. Although this idea was not supported by any hard evidence and could not ever be proven, encouraged by Wittkower it established Rowe's way of speculating and imagining what might have happened: an approach to the history of architecture that was largely imaginary and factually questionable, but which he gradually built into a vastly erudite, coherently argued way of thinking and seeing that exasperated conventional historians, but became the inspiration for a generation of practising architects to consider history imaginatively, as an active component in their design process.

Le Corbusier's Villa Savoye was compared in studies by Colin Rowe directly to Palladio's neoclassical Villa Rotonda.

The originality of Rowe's approach was his use of juxtapositions and comparisons between cultural events that conventional history kept widely separated and categorised, and that he unearthed from his vast personal erudition (in constant development) and placed side by side for comparison. This unorthodox and non-chronological view of history then made it possible for him to develop theoretical speculations such as his famous essay "The Mathematics of the Ideal Villa" (1947) in which he theorised that there were compositional "rules" in Palladio's villas that could be demonstrated to correspond to similar "rules" in Le Corbusier's villas at Poissy and Garches. Although like his MA thesis, this proposal was impossible to support with any evidence, as a speculation it enabled Rowe to elaborate an astonishingly fresh and provocative trans-historical critique of both Palladio and Le Corbusier, in which the architecture of both was assessed not in chronological time, but side by side in the present moment.

The originality of this approach had the effect of re-situating the assessment of modern architecture within history and acknowledged history as an active influence. Many years later when Rowe's influence had spread worldwide, this approach had become a key element in the process of architectural and urban design: if "the presence of the past" was evident in the work of many architects in the late 20th century, from James Stirling to Aldo Rossi, Robert Venturi, Oswald Matthias Ungers, Peter Eisenman, Michael Graves and others, this was largely due to the influence of Rowe. More recently, theorists and critics of the digital turn in architecture stressed the need to update Rowe's method for the present.

== Teaching and writings ==
Between 1950 and 1952, as a tutor at the Liverpool School of Architecture, he inculcated this original approach to modern architecture into the malleable 24-year-old architecture student James Stirling, only six years his junior. In Rowe's view, by that time modernism in architecture was already finished; what was intended to be a revolution had failed, but in Stirling he had found the means to create a new type of "modernist neo-classicist" architect; the two became lifelong friends, and all of Stirling's work in architectural practice was deeply indebted to Rowe's more or less continuous critical input. It has often been said that Stirling was "Rowe's draughtsman".

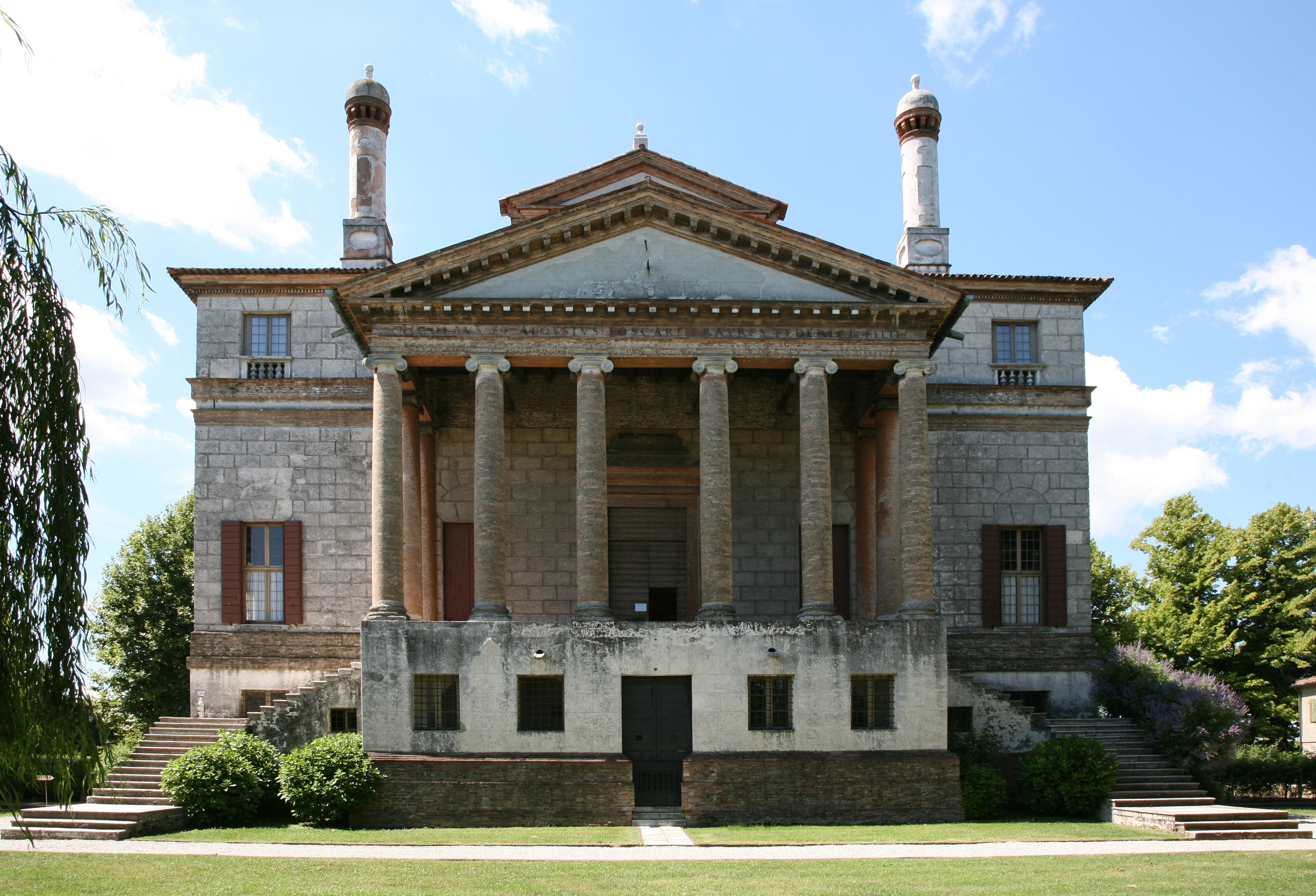
Villa Foscari by Palladio was studied by Colin Rowe in his essay on "The Mathematics of the Ideal Villa".

Between the 1950s and his death, Rowe published a number of widely influential papers that influenced architecture by further developing the theory that there is a conceptual relationship between modernity and tradition, specifically Classicism in its various manifestations, and Modern Movement "white architecture" of the 1920s - a viewpoint first put forward by Emil Kaufmann in his classic book "Von Ledoux bis Le Courbusier" (1933). Although he remained an admirer of the achievements of the 1920s modernists, chiefly in the work of Le Corbusier, Rowe also subjected the modern movement, which he considered a failure, to subversive modes of criticism and interpretation.

Rowe was among the first to openly denounce the failures of modernist urban planning and its destructive effects on the historic city; many of his most important books and essays are in fact more concerned with urban form than with architectural language. This early work, led to the contextualism school of thought which was likewise critical of modern urban design and architectural theory of design wherein modern building types are harmonized with urban forms usual to a traditional city.

Rowe was the Andrew Dickson White Professor of Architecture at Cornell University, where he taught from 1962 until his retirement in 1990. In 1970, he was a Resident Architect at the American Academy in Rome. In the course of his academic career he focused on developing an alternative method of urban design derived in part from the earlier work of Camillo Sitte but largely original, and based on the making of cities through a process of collaged, superimposed pieces; the ideal model for this pragmatic, anti-doctrinaire approach was the ruined villa of the Roman Emperor Hadrian at Tivoli, outside Rome. In 1981 he started the Cornell Journal of Architecture and contributed to issue 1 with "The Present Urban Predicament" and to issue 2 with "Program vs. Paradigm."

His chief significance was as a teacher and writer on these subjects, which greatly influenced architectural thinking. His book Collage City (with Fred Koetter) is his theoretical treatise that sets out various analyses of urban form in a number of existing cities known to be aesthetically successful, examining their actually existing urban structure as found, revealing it to be the end product of a ceaseless process of fragmentation, the collision/superimposition/contamination of many diverse ideas imposed on it by successive generations, each with its own idea. In architecture his thinking paralleled his ideas about the city: he was nostalgic for nineteenth-century eclecticism, advocating that architecture in the modern age should abandon its purist abstraction and allow itself to be influenced by influxes of historical references.

Philosophically, Rowe's conviction that pragmatic, discrete, and episodic ideas are more meaningful and useful than totalising, overarching, all-inclusive concepts led him towards the political right, and to such philosophers as Isaiah Berlin and Karl Popper; but paradoxically this also situated his thinking in the same general zone as left-leaning philosophers like Gianni Vattimo. As he continued to publish ground-breaking, intellectually rich, unconventional essays on the history and theory of architecture, and became a permanent resident of the United States (becoming a US citizen towards the end of his life) he went on to influence many other architects, students, and architectural educators during the 1960s, 1970s, and 1980s (in 1966 he served as a fellow at the Graham Foundation in Chicago) at a time when there was a move towards Postmodern architecture with which he may be partly associated - though only to a very limited extent, and only in a philosophical sense, since his intellectual range, and his all-inclusive interest in every movement and style of architecture, placed him far outside any particular stylistic category. Rowe died at the age of 79 on 5 November 1999 in Arlington County, Virginia. A memorial program was held in his honor on 6 February 2000 at The Carnegie Institution of Washington, Washington, DC.

== "The Mathematics of the Ideal Villa" ==
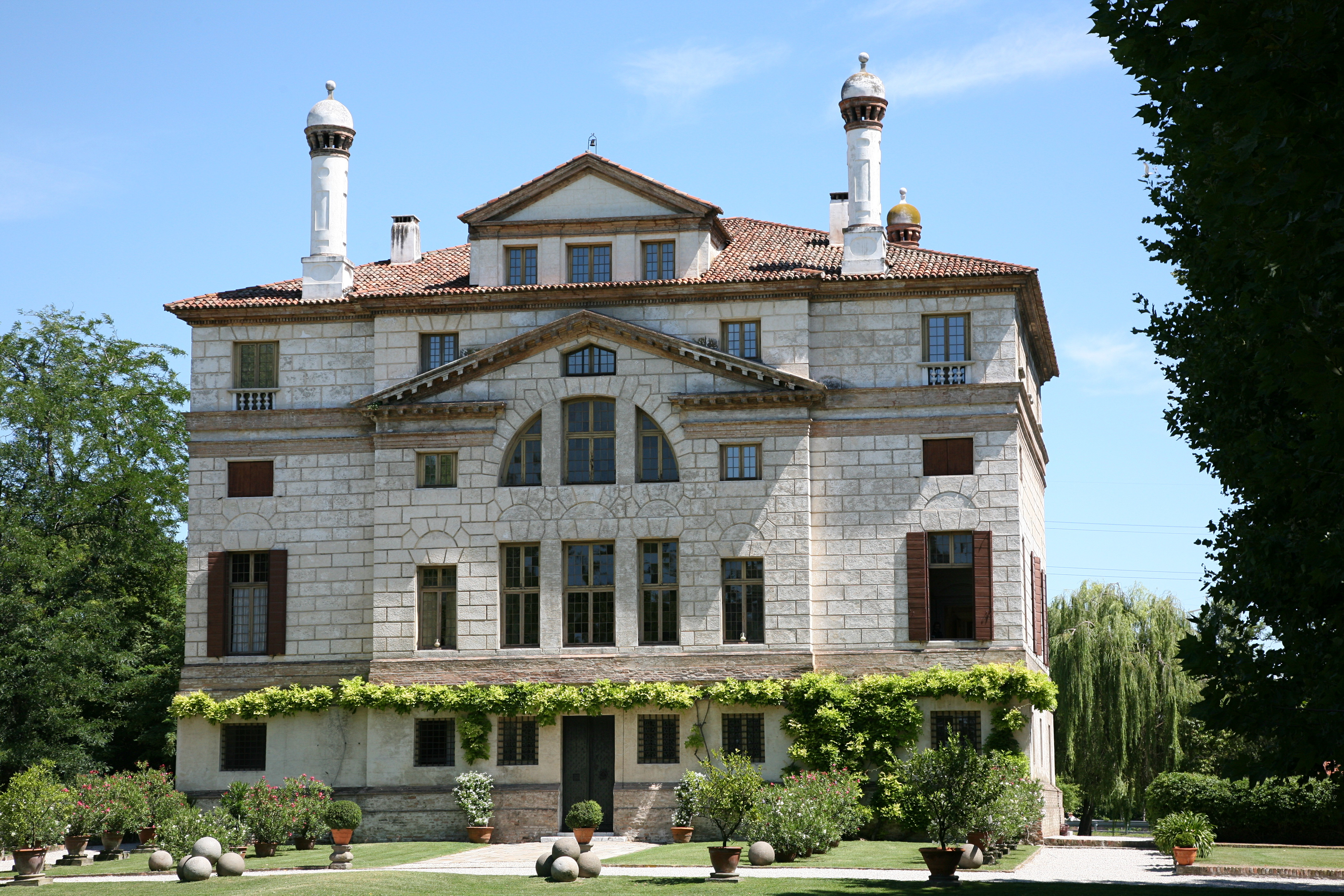
Villa Foscari was compared to Le Corbusier's work in studies by Colin Rowe.

Colin Rowe's seminal essay went through five printings in four years and was titled "The Mathematics of the Ideal Villa." The text was printed both in essay form and in book form under the same title along with eight other comparably supportive essays. In this essay, Rowe presented his original view of the direct comparative reading of modern architecture alongside neo-Classical architecture. This approach was not generally done or accepted in the architectural literature of the time when the essay was first published in 1947. Rowe asserted the basis of a direct comparison of a villa by Le Corbusier and a villa by Andrea Palladio from the 16th century. Rowe's choice was to place Palladio's masterpiece from the 1550s called the Malcontenta (Villa Foscari) into direct comparison with Le Corbusier's villa at Garches for Mr. and Mrs. Michael Stein. Rowe's argument began by asserting that both Garches and the Malcontenta are conceived of as single blocks of roughly identical volumes measuring "8 units in length, by 5 1/2 in breadth, by 5 in height." Rowe then observes that "Each house exhibits an alternative rhythm of double and single intervals; and each house ... displays a comparable tripartite distribution of line of support." As Rowe summarizes: "Palladio is concerned with a logical disposition of motifs dogmatically accepted ... while Le Corbusier ... contrasts the new system with the old and is a little more comprehensive."

Rowe continues on in the essay to conclude that, "If Le Corbusier's facades are for him the primary demonstrations of the virtues of a mathematical discipline, with Palladio it would seem that the ultimate proof of his theory lies in his plan ... (At Malcontenta) [t]he facades become complicated, their strict Platonic rationale may be ultimately vitiated by the traditional presence ... of the Ionic order which possesses its own rationale and which inevitable introduces an alternative system of measurement." In the end of his essay, Rowe transfers his approach to the shared sympathy of Le Corbusier and Palladio for the mathematical description of the ideal villa by discussing the Villa Savoye in comparison to Palladio's Villa Rotonda, which he sees as analogous. In his famous closing quote, Rowe gives his highest compliment to both Palladio and Le Corbusier together stating that Palladio and Le Corbusier had "become the source of innumerable pastiches and of tediously amusing exhibition techniques; but it is the magnificently realized quality of the originals which one rarely finds in the works of neo-Palladians and exponents of 'le style Corbu'". For Rowe, in the end these two master architects would have the more enduring word on the mathematics of the ideal villa than the majority of their followers.

== Selected works ==
- The Mathematics of the Ideal Villa and Other Essays (1976)
- The Architecture of Good Intentions (1994)
- As I Was Saying: Recollections and Miscellaneous Essays, Collected essays, letters, and papers collected in 3 volumes by MIT Press from his lifetime, Paperback: 216 pages, The MIT Press (July 23, 1999), ISBN 978-0262681100
- I Almost Forgot: Unpublished Colin Rowe, edited by Daniel Naegele. The MIT Press (January 10, 2023), ISBN 9780262047128
- Collage City with Fred Koetter, The MIT Press (1978)
- Italian Architecture of the 16th Century, with Leon Satkowski, Princeton Architectural Press, 2002, ISBN 1-56898-331-X, hard cover: 331 pages.

article

- "Transparency: Literal and Phenomenal" Part II, Perspecta 13/14, 1971
- "The Present Urban Predicament" in The Cornell Journal of Architecture, no.1, 1981
- "Roma Interrotta" in Architectural Design Profile, Vol. 49, No. 3-4 (1979)

== See also ==
- The Texas Rangers
