= 1975 in architecture =

The year 1975 in architecture involved some significant architectural events and new buildings.

== Events ==
- Planned residential development of Noak Bridge in the Borough of Basildon (England), designed by George Garrard and Maurice Naunton, begins.

== Buildings and structures ==
=== Buildings opened ===
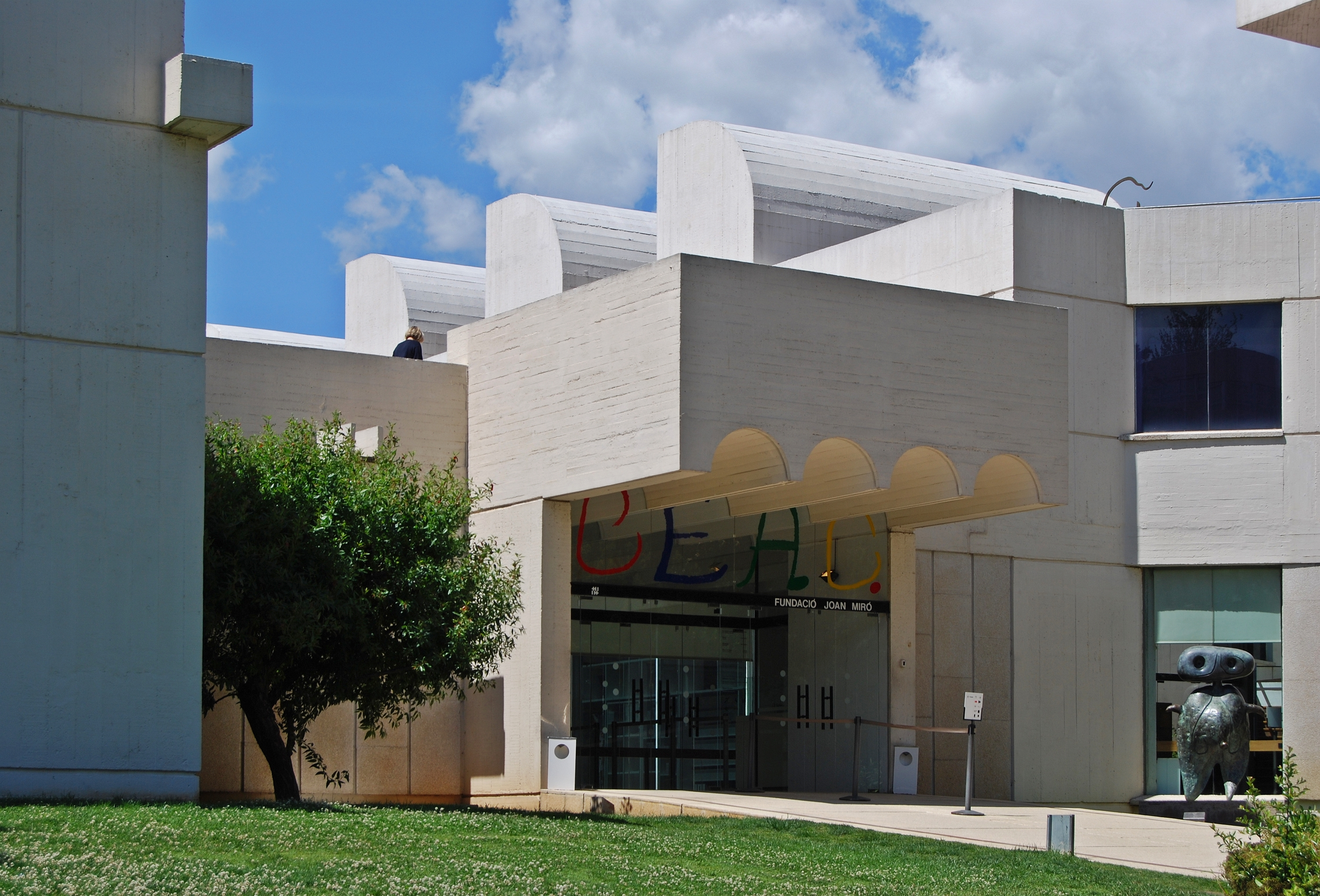
Fundació Joan Miró in Barcelona, Spain

- June 10 – Fundació Joan Miró in Barcelona, designed by Josep Lluís Sert.
- June 25 – Addleshaw Tower at Chester Cathedral in England, designed by George Pace.
- June 28 – Sir Thomas White Building, St John's College, Oxford, England, designed by Philip Dowson of Arup Associates.
- c. September – Metropolitan Correctional Center, Chicago, designed by Harry Weese.
- October 10 – Afrikaans Language Monument, Paarl, South Africa.
- December 10 – General Artigas Bridge, Uruguay River, Uruguay.
- Worth Abbey church in West Sussex, England, designed by Francis Pollen, consecrated.
- Malmö Konsthall in Sweden, designed by Klas Anshelm.

=== Buildings completed ===
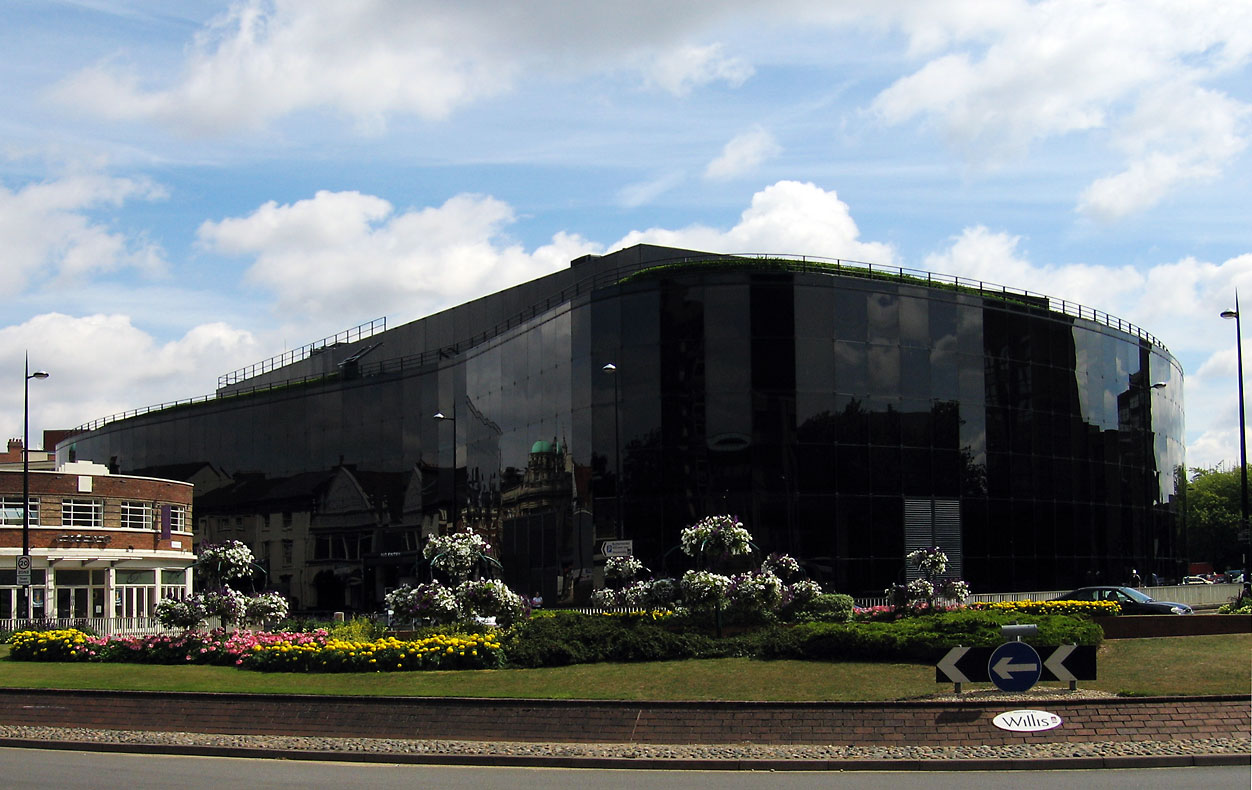
Foster's Willis Building (Ipswich).

- Frank House, also known as House VI, designed by Peter Eisenman.
- First Canadian Place in Toronto, Ontario, Canada, the tallest building in Canada (1975-present).
- The Fernmeldeturm Mannheim in Mannheim, Germany.
- The Willis Building (Ipswich), England, designed by Foster Associates.
- Granite Tower in Billings, Montana, designed by Harrison Fagg's partnership.
- Modissa (fashion store) in Zürich, Switzerland, designed by Werner Gantenbein.
- Foire Internationale de Dakar in Senegal, designed by Jean-François Lamoureux and Jean-Louis Marin.
- Ramot Polin housing development in East Jerusalem, designed by Zvi Hecker.
- River Park Towers, The Bronx, designed by Davis, Brody & Associates
- Les Arcades du Lac and Le Viaduc housing development in Saint-Quentin-en-Yvelines, near Versailles, France, designed by Ricardo Bofill Taller de Arquitectura.
- Warszawa Centralna railway station in Poland (by Arseniusz Romanowicz).

== Awards ==
- Architecture Firm Award – Davis, Brody & Associates
- Grand prix national de l'architecture – Jean Willerval
- RAIA Gold Medal – Sydney Ancher
- RIBA Royal Gold Medal – Michael Scott
- Twenty-five Year Award – Philip Johnson's Residence

== Events ==
- Designated European Architectural Heritage Year by the Council of Europe.
- SAVE Britain's Heritage founded as a campaigning group for endangered buildings.

== Births ==
- December 3 – Julien De Smedt, Belgian-Danish architect

== Deaths ==
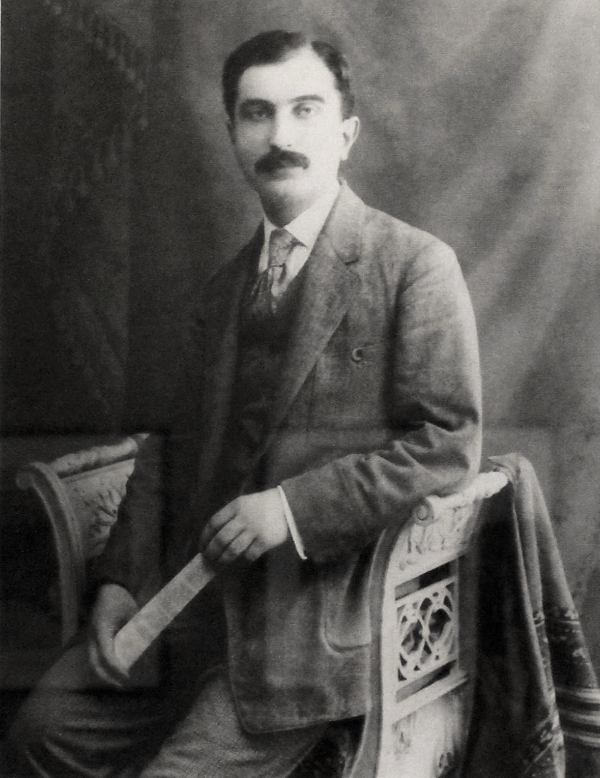
Mihran Mesrobian

- June 2 – Robert Matthew, Scottish modernist architect (born 1906)
- June 5 – John Leopold Denman, English Neo-Georgian architect (born 1882)
- June 7 – Robert Schmertz, American folk musician and architect (born 1898)
- June 14 – Pablo Antonio, Filipino modernist architect (born 1901)
- July 9 – Edward D. Dart, American Mid-Century Modern architect (born 1922)
- August 23 – George Pace, English ecclesiastical architect (born 1915)
- August 28 – Norman Jewson, English Arts & Crafts architect (born 1884)
- September 21 – Mihran Mesrobian, Armenian American architect (born 1889)
- December 23 – Ejnar Mindedal Rasmussen, Danish Neoclassical architect (born 1892)
- December 29 – Sigurd Lewerentz, Swedish architect and furniture designer (born 1885)
