= Gantenbein (surname) =

Gantenbein is a surname. Notable people with the surname include:

- Burkhard Gantenbein (1912–2007), Swiss field handball player
- Joe Gantenbein (1915–1993), American baseball player
- Milt Gantenbein (1910–1988), American football player
- Sandra Gantenbein (born c. 1984), Swiss curler
- Talina Gantenbein (born 1998), Swiss freestyle skier
- Werner Gantenbein (1924–2004), Swiss architect

== See also ==
- Gantenbein, a 1964 novel
