= City of Culture of Galicia =

Cultural center in Santiago de Compostela, Spain

Coordinates: 42°52′13″N 8°31′32″W

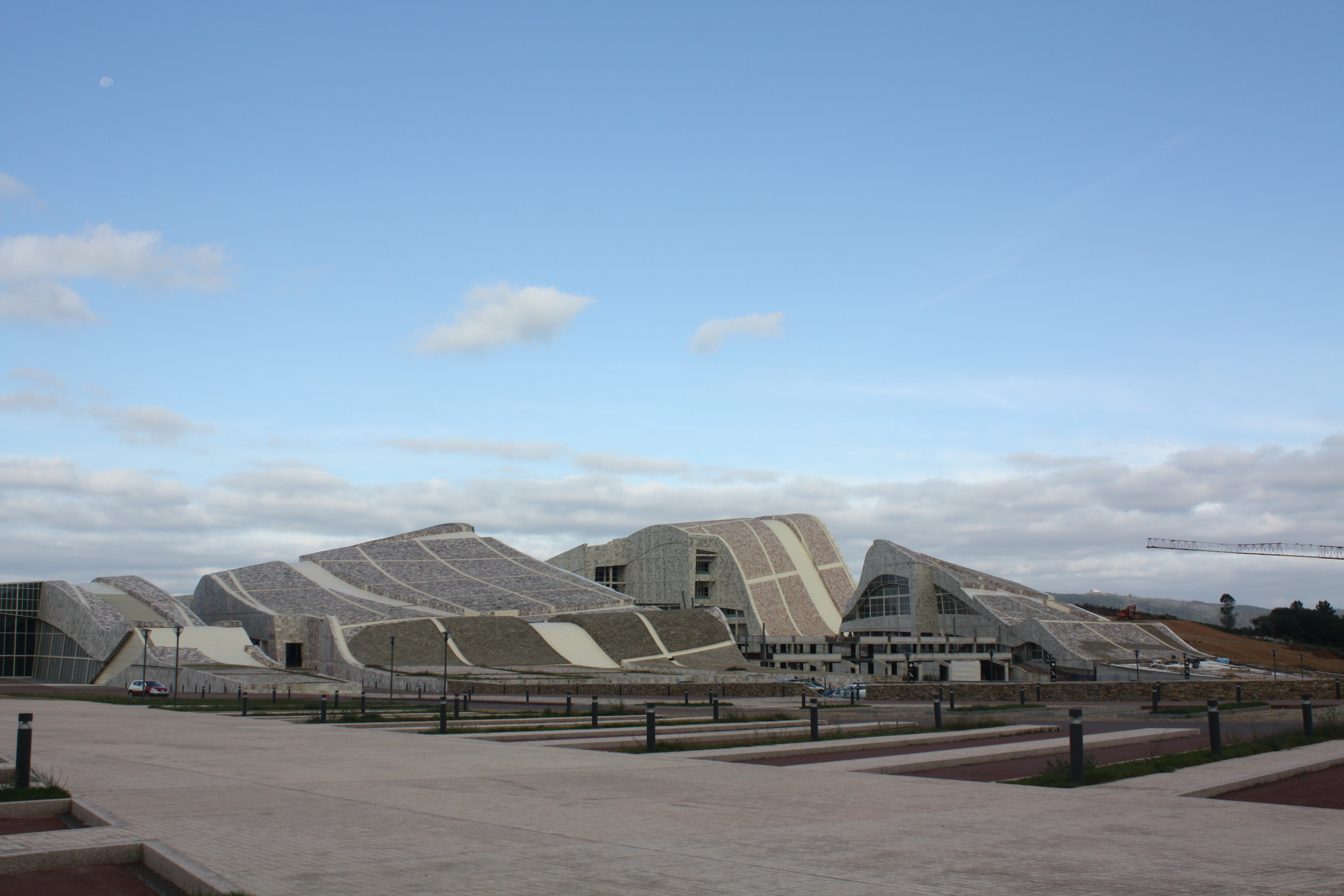
General view of the City of Culture of Galicia

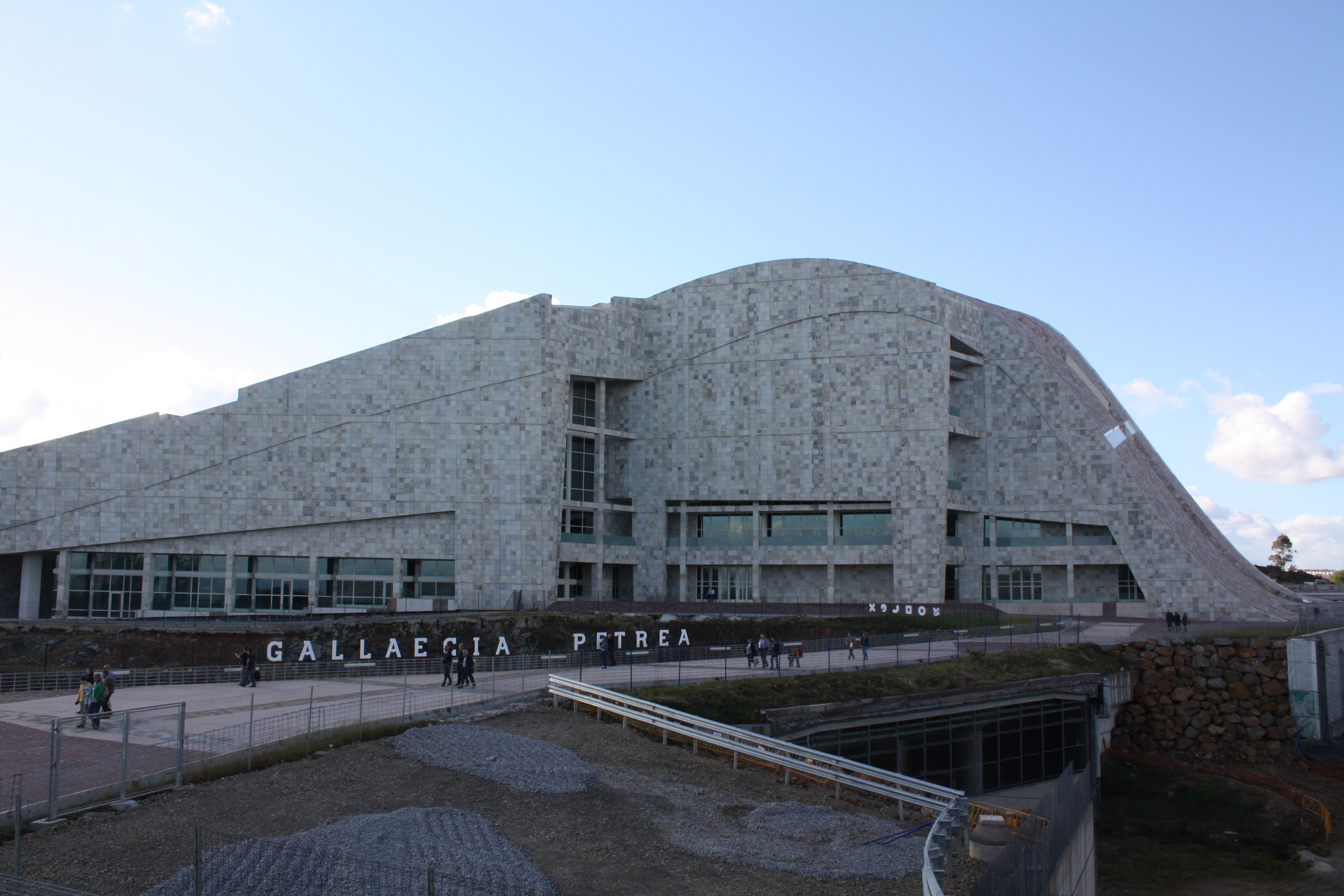
Gaias Centre Museum

The City of Culture of Galicia (Galician: Cidade da Cultura de Galicia or simply Cidade da Cultura) is a complex of cultural buildings in Santiago de Compostela, Galicia, Spain, designed by a group of architects led by Peter Eisenman.

Construction was challenging and expensive as the design of the buildings involves high degree contours, meant to make the buildings look like rolling hills. Nearly every window of the thousands that are part of the external façade has its own custom shape. In 2013 it was announced that after more than a decade, construction of the project would be halted, and the International Art Center and Music and Scenic Arts Center will not be built.

== History ==
=== Historical context ===
The idea of building the complex emerged amid the development of other major urban and cultural projects elsewhere in Spain, such as the Guggenheim Museum in Bilbao, which opened in October 1997, and the City of Arts and Sciences in Valencia, which opened in June 1998.

=== Competition ===
In February 1999 the Parliament of Galicia, led by Manuel Fraga, held an international design competition for a cultural center on Mount Gaiás. The entrants were Ricardo Bofill, Manuel Gallego Jorreto, Annette Gigon and Mike Guyer, Steven Holl, Rem Koolhaas, Daniel Libeskind, Juan Navarro Baldeweg, Jean Nouvel, Dominique Perrault, Cesar Portela, Santiago Calatrava, who later withdrew his proposal, and Eisenman, whose proposal was selected for both conceptual uniqueness and exceptional harmony with the place.

The concept of the project is a new peak on Monte Gaiás, made up of a stony crust reminiscent of an archaeological site divided by natural breaks that resemble scallops, the traditional symbol of Compostela.

=== Construction ===
Construction began in 2001, but the project soon faced difficulties, including substantial cost overruns and questions about the intended uses of some of its buildings. Following the change in the Galician regional government in 2005 and the formation of a coalition between the PSdeG-PSOE and the BNG, the project underwent a review. In January 2006, the Regional Ministry of Culture temporarily suspended construction work on two buildings, the Music Theatre and the New Technologies Building, to allow their intended uses and contents to be reconsidered. The review also affected the other buildings, although priority was given to completing the Library of Galicia, the Archive of Galicia and the Museum of the History of Galicia, whose construction was already at a more advanced stage. The functions originally envisaged for the Music Theatre and the New Technologies Building were subsequently replaced by new proposals.

Due to the 2008 Spanish financial crisis, the first buildings did not open until January 2011, when the Prince and Princess of Asturias inaugurated the Library and the Archive. However, in 2013, the Regional Government of Galicia decided to halt construction of the International Centre for Art and the Centre for Music and Performing Arts permanently.

The building site has also become the base for the development of a public transparency urban experiment by the Spanish architect and artist Andrés Jaque. With Jaque's 12 Actions to Make the Cidade da Cultura Transparent, the building site was equipped with devices that make the political implications and ecological extension of the construction works understandable for the general public.

In 2021 the Fontán Building (Edificio Fontán) was inaugurated, in the place where the auditorium was originally going to be built, using part of the already existing structure.

== Buildings ==
- Library and Archive of Galicia: both institutions share the same building, which has 15,702 m² of usable space. The library aims to be the flagship of the Galician library system. For its part, the archive is the reference centre of the Galician archives system and its mission is to receive, safeguard and make available to citizens all those documents which, because of their value, need to be preserved.
- Gaiás Centre Museum: the largest building in the complex, standing 43 metres tall and covering an area of over 16,000 square metres. It doesn't have a permanent collection and hosts temporary exhibitions.
- Centre for Cultural Innovation: it houses the management and logistics departments of the City of Culture of Galicia Foundation and the headquarters of the Agency for the Technological Modernisation of Galicia (AMTEGA).
- Gaiás Centre for Entrepreneurship: space designed to foster the creation and consolidation of cultural, creative and technological businesses.
- Hejduk Towers: designed in 1992 by the architect John Hejduk as botanical greenhouses for the nearby Belvís Park, but they were never built. After Hejduk's death, Peter Eisenman decided to recover the project as an art exhibition space. One of the towers has a lighting system that makes it visible at night from much of the city.
- Fontán Building: the newest building, designed by architect Andés Perea using part of the structure of the unfinished auditorium. It's home to the headquarters of the Galician University System, as well as institutions dedicated to the study of cultural heritage. Next to it there's a small open-air theatre.
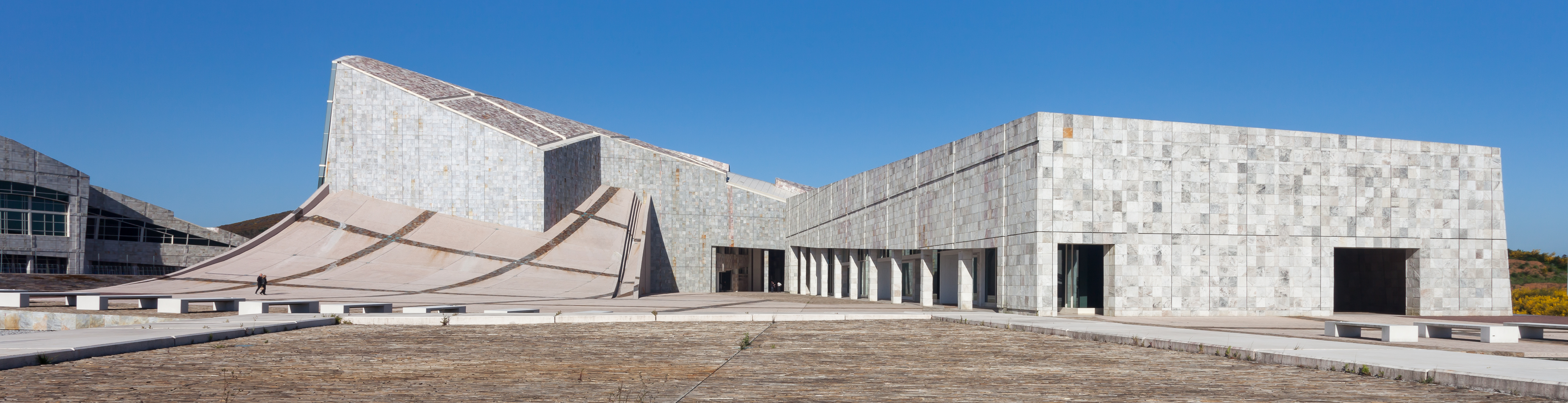
The Library and Archive (left) and the Gaiás Centre for Entrepreneurship (right)

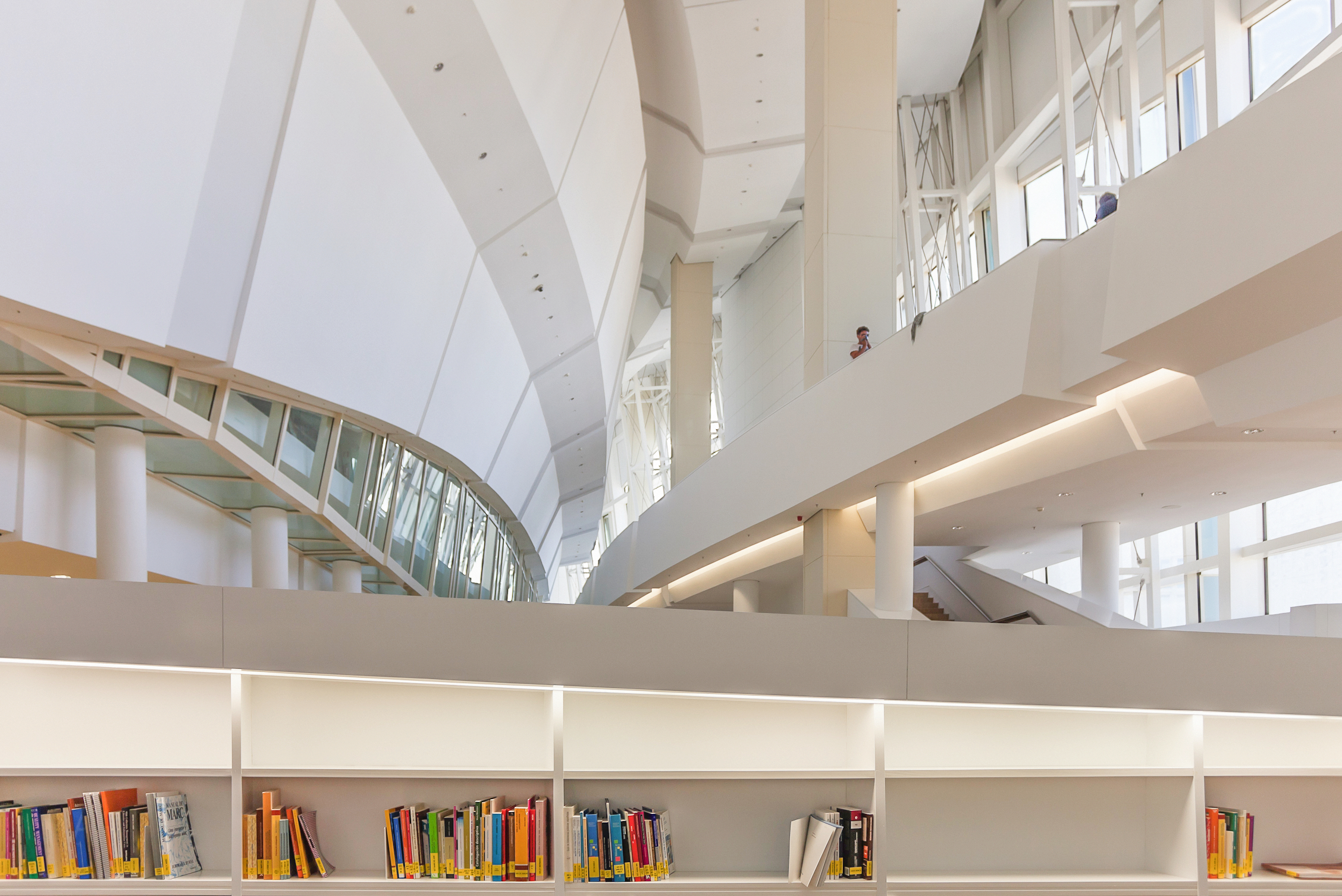
Interior of the library

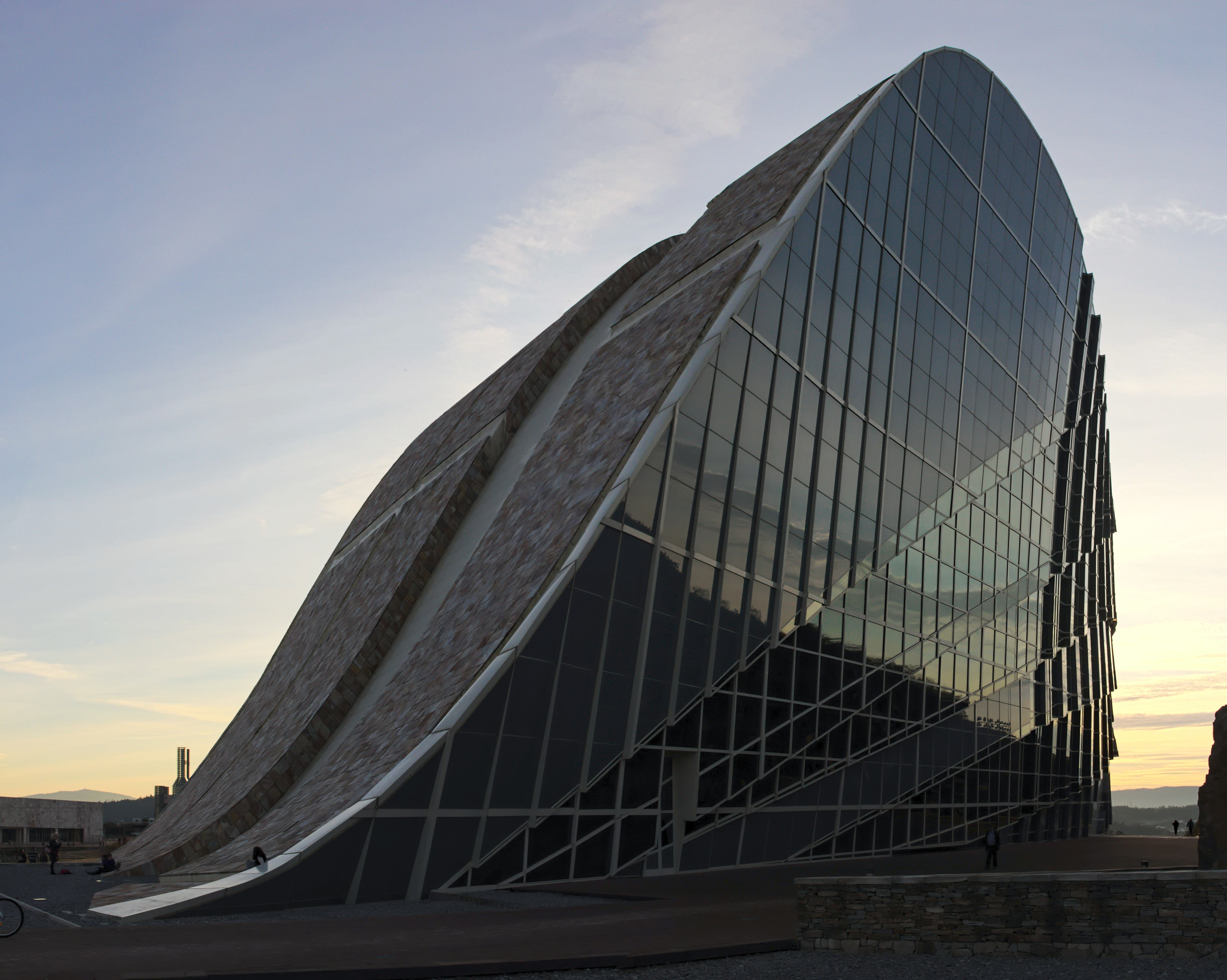
Gaiás Centre Museum

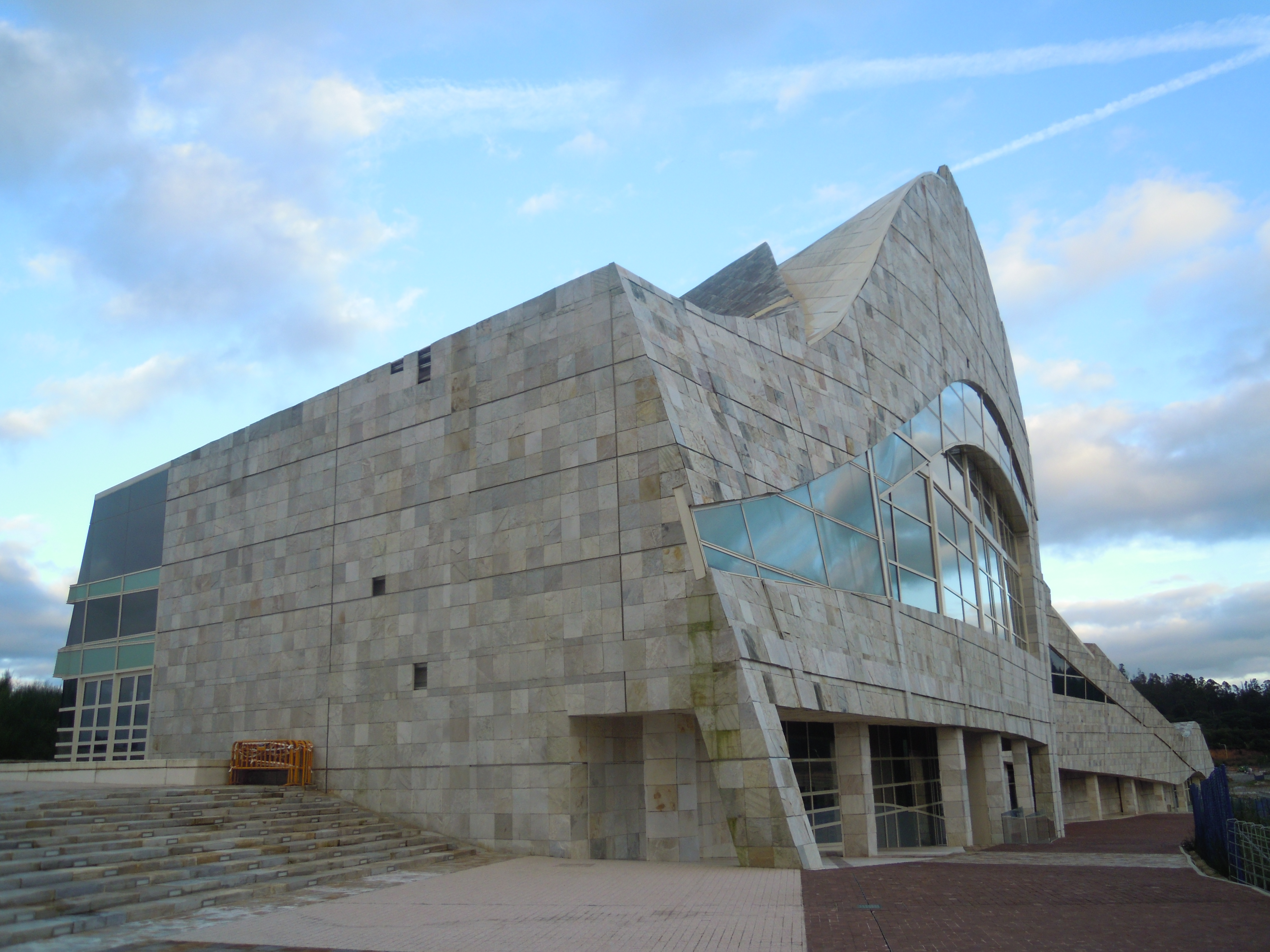
Centre for Cultural Innovation

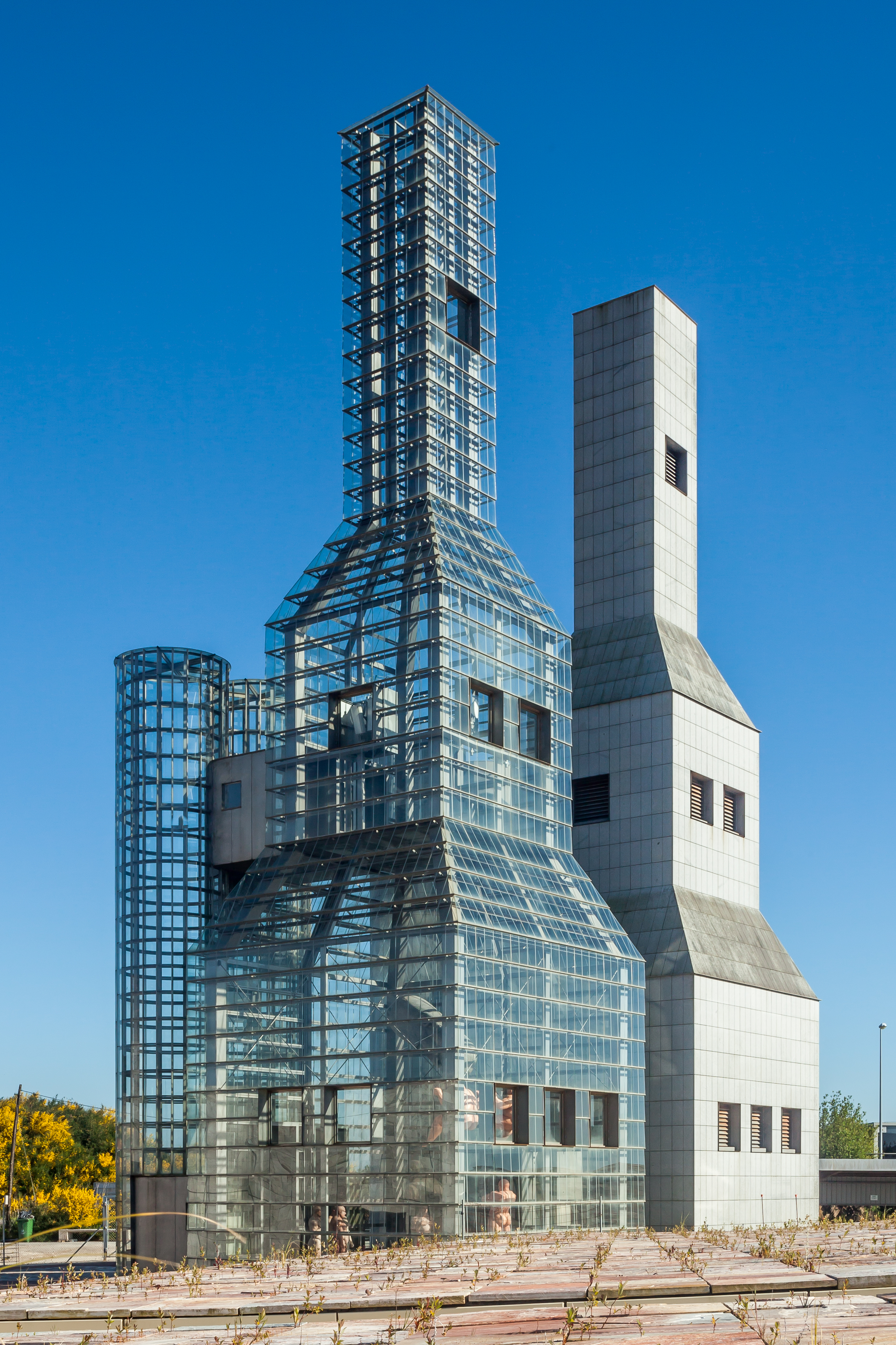
Hejduk Towers

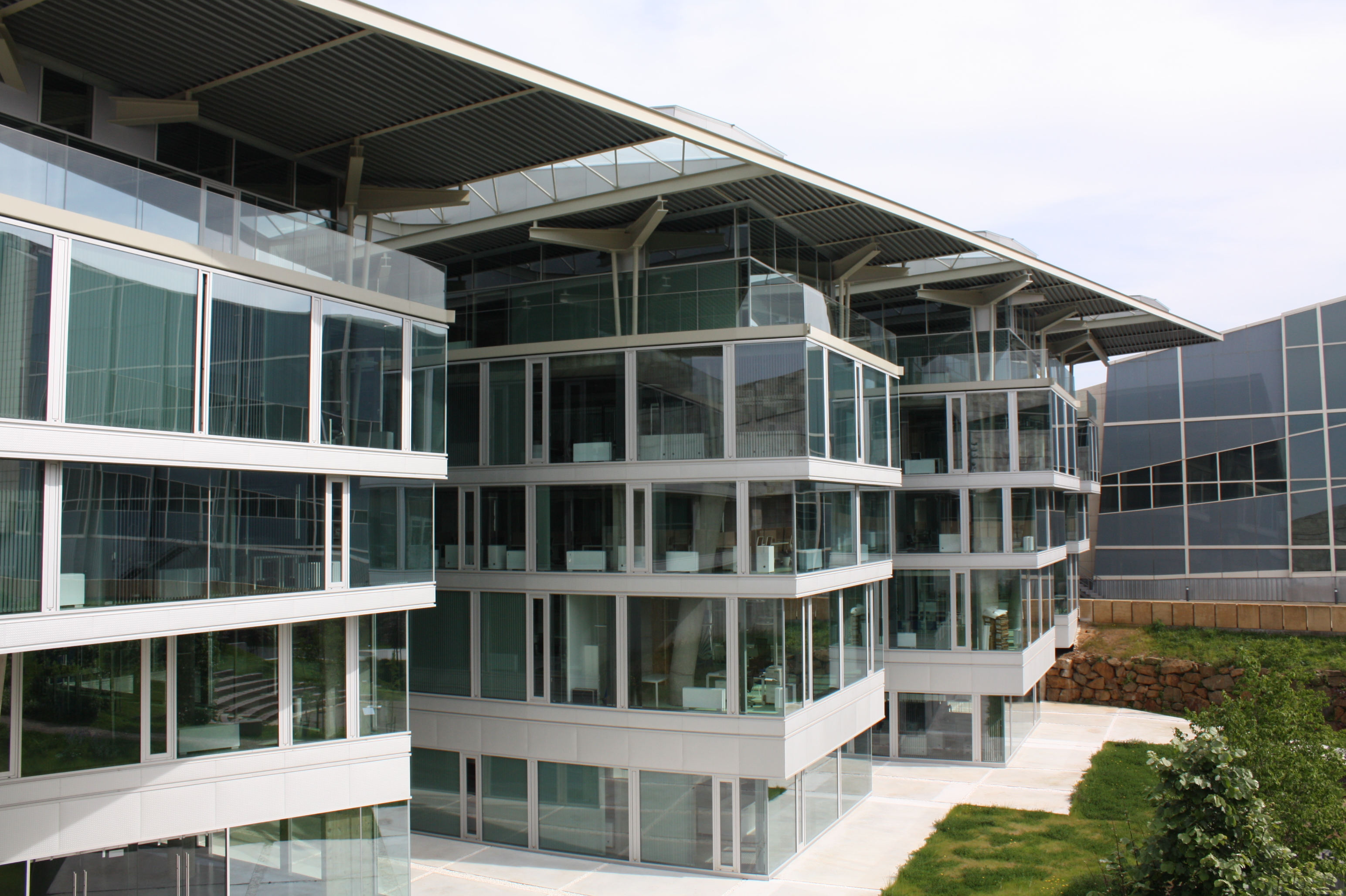
Fontán Building

== Controversy ==
The project ended up costing more than four times the original budget and has not attracted significant numbers of visitors, becoming a white elephant for subsequent governments and taxpayers. Construction of the final two planned buildings was stopped in 2012 and terminated definitively in March 2013 following high cost overruns.
