= Lateness (book) =

2020 book by Peter Eisenman

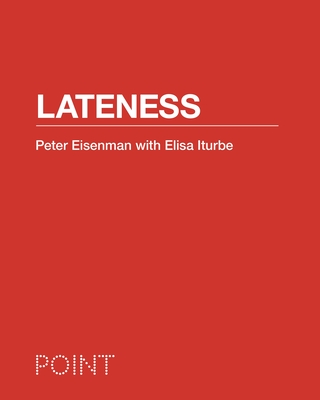
- Author: Peter Eisenman
- Language: English
- Subject: Architectural theory, Critical Theory
- Publisher: Princeton University Press
- Publication date: 2020
- Publication place: The United States
- ISBN: 9780691147222

Lateness is a 2020 book written by the architect and theorist, Peter Eisenman in collaboration with Elisa Iturbe, who is a professor of architecture at Yale School of Architecture. The book is edited by Sarah Whiting, the professor of architecture at Harvard University, and was published by Princeton University Press. In it, Eisenman focuses on three figures to explain the quality of lateness: Adolf Loos, Aldo Rossi and John Hejduk, each selected from a period of architecture in the 20th century. Along with this, Eisenman and Iturbe discuss the origins of the critical theory illustrated in Critical theory of Frankfurt School.
