= House VI =

Building in Cornwall, Connecticut, U.S.

Frank Residence (House VI)
- House VI in 1977

General information
- Architectural style: Deconstructivist
- Location: Cornwall, Connecticut, United States
- Coordinates: 41.832723°N 73.321445°W
- Construction started: 1972
- Completed: 1975
- Client: Suzanne Frank

Technical details
- Structural system: wood frame and sealed wood panels

Design and construction
- Architect: Peter Eisenman

House VI, or the Frank Residence, is a building in Cornwall, Connecticut, designed by Peter Eisenman, completed in 1975. His second built work, this small getaway house, located on Great Hollow Road near Bird's Eye Brook in Cornwall, Connecticut (across from Mohawk Mountain Ski Area), has become famous for both its revolutionary definition of a house as much as for the physical problems of design and difficulty of use. At the time of construction, the architect was known almost exclusively as a theorist and "paper architect," promulgating a highly formalist approach to architecture he calls "postfunctionalism." Rather than form following function or an aesthetic design, the design emerged from a conceptual process, and remains pinned to that conceptual framework.

Eisenman's limited construction experience meant that the entire building was poorly detailed. The tiny building took three years to build, went completely over budget, and finally had to be reconstructed in 1987, leaving only the basic structure original. The Franks, in Peter Eisenman's House VI: The Client's Response, claim that they nonetheless love living in such a poetic structure, which they inhabit with their children. Also on the property is a barn for guests and supplies that do not fit in the kitchen.

== Design ==
The building is meant to be a "record of design process," where the structure that results is the methodical manipulation of a grid. To start, Eisenman created a form from the intersection of four planes, subsequently manipulating the structures again and again, until coherent spaces began to emerge. In this way, the fragmented slabs and columns lack a traditional purpose, or even a conventional modernist one. The envelope and structure of the building are just a manifestation of the changed elements of the original four slabs, with some limited modifications. The purely conceptual design meant that the architecture is strictly plastic, bearing no relationship to construction techniques or purely ornamental form.

Consequently, the use of the building was intentionally ignored—not fought against. Eisenman grudgingly permitted a handful of compromises, such as a bathroom, but the staircase lacks a handrail, there is a column abutting the kitchen table, and a glass strip originally divided the bedroom, preventing the installation of a double bed.
