= Addleshaw Tower =

Grade II listed bell tower in Chester, United Kingdom

Coordinates: 53.19157°N 2.88939°W

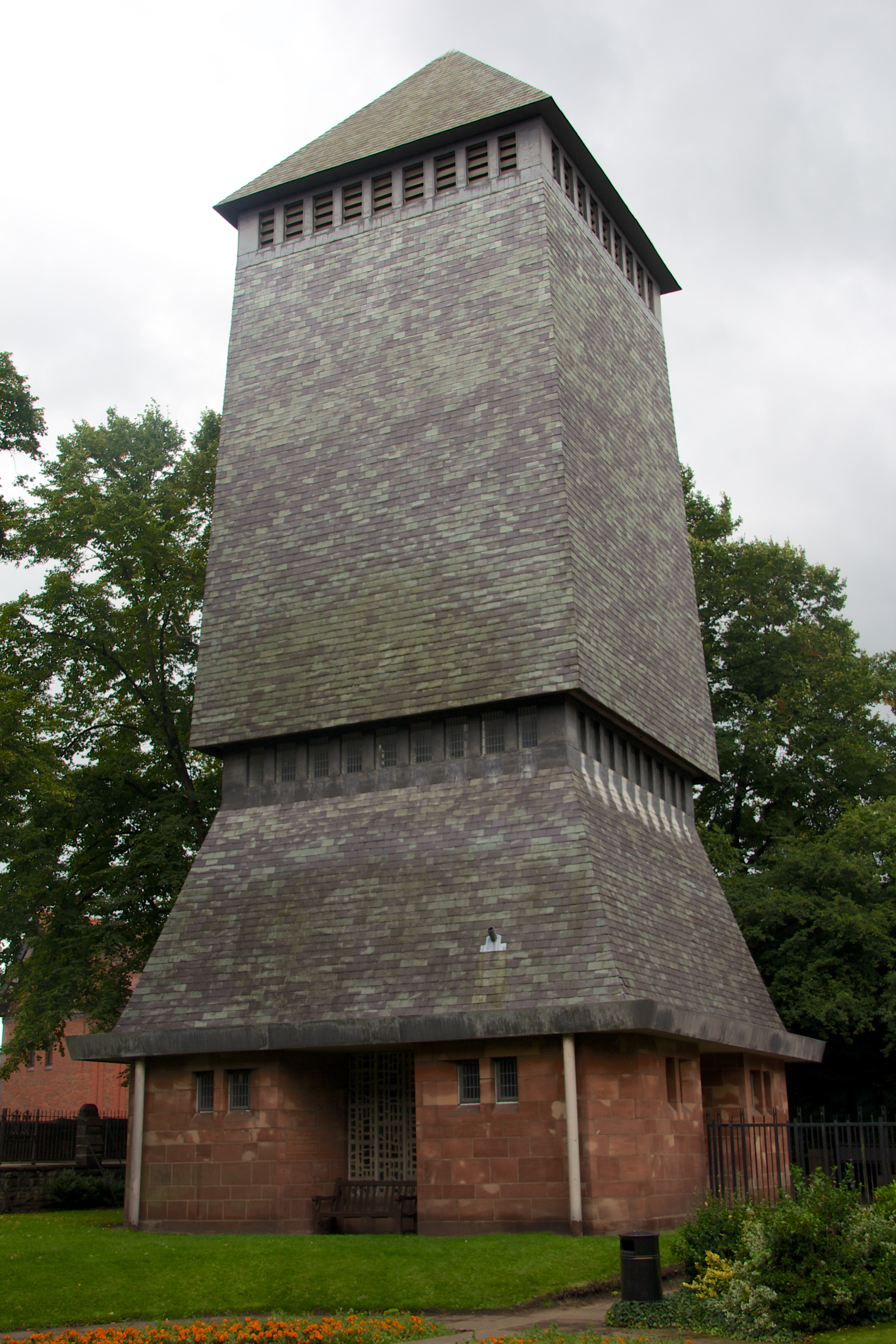
Addleshaw Tower: its slate-covered walls give it the look of a bergfried, a medieval fortified tower

Addleshaw Tower is the free-standing bell tower of Chester Cathedral, in Chester, Cheshire, England. It was designed by George Pace, and built to house the cathedral bells. These had been hung in the cathedral's central tower, and needed overhaul, but it was considered to be unsafe to re-hang them in the tower without disturbing its architectural features. Despite the design resulting in some local controversy, the tower is recorded in the National Heritage List for England as a designated Grade II listed building. It is the first free-standing bell tower to be built for an English cathedral since the 15th century.

== History ==
Towards the end of 1963, it was found that the bells of the cathedral, which were hung in the central tower, needed an overhaul, and ringing was suspended. In 1965, George Pace, the architect to York Minster, was commissioned to prepare a report. He recommended that the bells be recast and hung in a new bell frame. The installation and appropriate hanging of the bells presented several difficulties: access to the tower was difficult, the installation was potentially expensive and the new frame could not be installed in an ideal manner without obscuring the upper arches and galleries at the crossing, which were considered important architectural features. Pace recommended that consideration should be given to the building of a separate bell tower in the southeast corner of the churchyard.

The recommendation was accepted by the Dean and Chapter in 1968, and Pace was commissioned to design the tower. The design was shown at the 1969 Royal Academy summer exhibition. The tower was named after the dean, Revd G. W. O. Addleshaw. The foundation stone of the new tower was laid on 16 June 1973 by Lord Leverhulme, Lord Lieutenant of Cheshire. The engineer for the project was Ove Arup and Partners, and the builders were A. Monk and Company, and Frankipile Limited. Pile foundations were necessary because the tower was built on the site of an old burial ground, and the sandstone bedrock was near the surface.

Nine of the bells in the central tower of the cathedral were removed in February 1968 and were recast by John Taylor and Company of Loughborough into a ring of twelve bells and a flat sixth. Two bells were left in the cathedral tower, one cast by Henry Oldfield in 1606, and one cast by William Clibury in 1626. The bells were installed in the new tower towards the end of 1974, with the first trial ring on 23 October 1974. The bells were rung for a wedding for the first time on 26 February 1975, the bride being a member of the Grosvenor family. The tower was formally opened on 25 June 1975, by the Duke of Gloucester. For the occasion, each bell was rung separately by a ringer from one of thirteen different towers in the Chester area. The ceremonies concluded with a peal of Kent Treble Bob Maximus.

The ringing chamber of the tower was refurbished in 2008. The tower is the headquarters of the Chester Diocesan Guild of Church Bell Ringers.

== Architecture ==
The Addleshaw Tower is the first free-standing bell tower to be built by an English cathedral since the 15th century. (Note: Other free-standing bell towers at English cathedrals are at Chichester, which was built in the 14th or 15th century, and St Edmundsbury.) It has a square plan and is 85 feet (26 m) high. The tower is built on a reinforced concrete frame. The base is faced in local pink sandstone, and contains an entrance on the southwest side, with windows on the other three sides. One window on each side contains Dalle de verre stained glass, and these are flanked by smaller pairs of windows. The entrance is deeply recessed and contains two pairs of timber doors. The upper parts of the tower are faced in Bethesda slates on a timber frame. Above the base are two stages with internally inclined walls, the upper stage being taller than the lower stage. Around the top of the lower stage is a ring of small, square windows. At the top of the upper stage is a ring of small louvred bell openings. On the summit of the tower is a pyramidal roof, which is also covered in slates.

The base contains a meeting room, a small kitchen, and toilets. A spiral staircase leads up to the ringing chamber, where the bell ropes are arranged in a circle. On the walls of the chamber are tablets commemorating peals previously rung by the guild. Above the ringing chamber is the sound chamber and, at the top, the belfry.

== Appraisal ==
When first built, the appearance of the tower was controversial, being known locally as the "Chester Rocket". The authors of the Buildings of England series describe it as being "uncompromisingly Modernist". The tower was designated as a Grade II listed building on 9 July 2012. The reasons given for its designation include its architectural interest, including the use of both traditionalism and modernism, and the use of traditional and modern materials; its design aesthetic, respecting its historic setting but also creating something modern; and the fact that it was designed by a notable 20th-century ecclesiastical architect. The reasons also note that it was Pace's last major work before his death.

== See also ==
- Grade II listed buildings in Chester (central)
- List of works by George Pace

== Notes and references ==
Notes
