= Peter Eisenman =

American architect

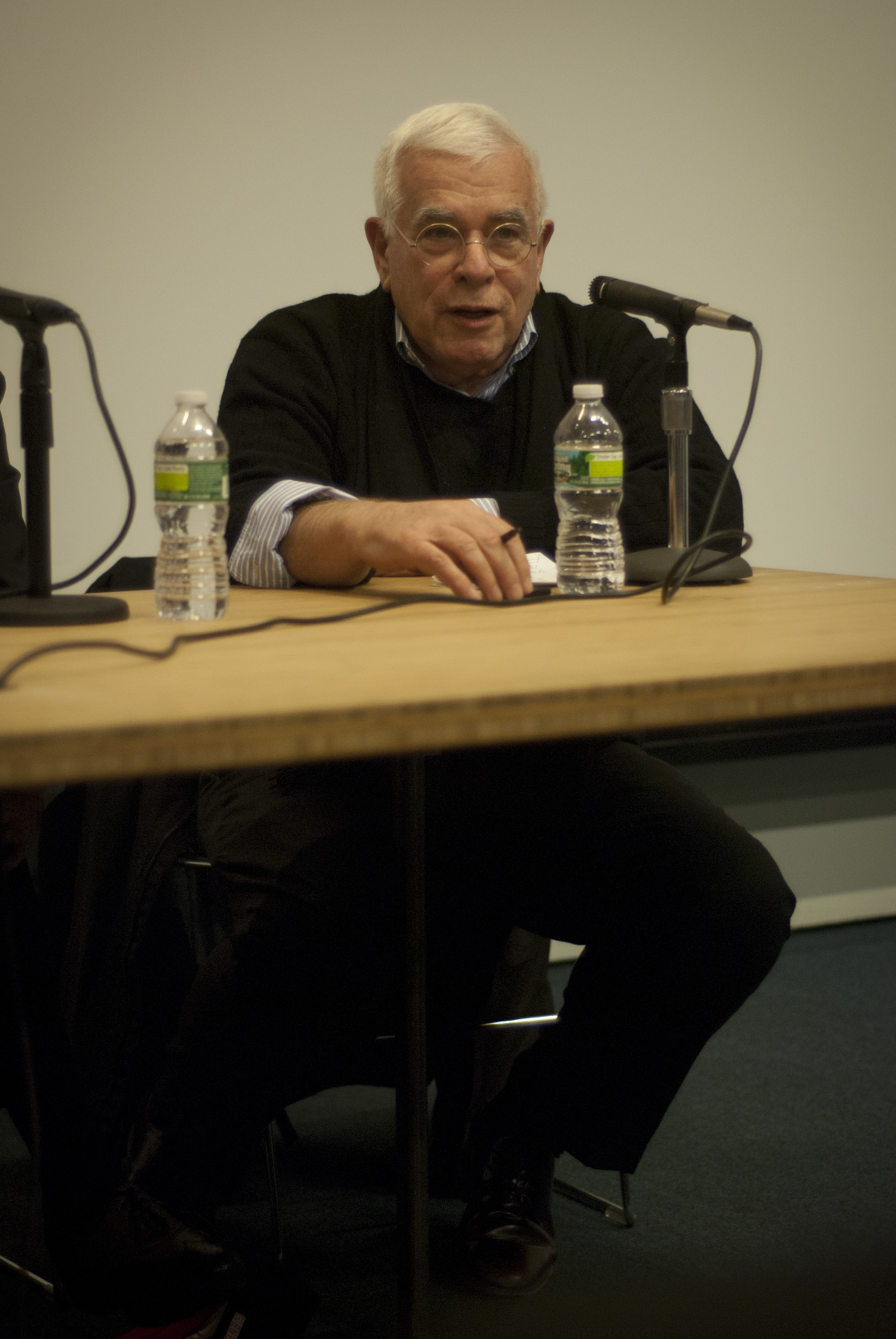
- Eisenman in 2011
- Born: August 11, 1932 (age 94); Newark, New Jersey, U.S.
- Education: Cornell University (B.Arch); Columbia University (M.Arch); University of Cambridge (MA, PhD)
- Occupation: Architect
- Buildings: House VI; Memorial to the Murdered Jews of Europe; City of Culture of Galicia

Peter David Eisenman (born August 11, 1932) is an American architect. He is one of the New York Five. Eisenman specializes in high modernist and deconstructive designs, and authored several architectural books. His work has won him several awards, including the Wolf Prize in Arts.

== Early life and education ==
Peter Eisenman was born to Jewish parents on August 11, 1932, in Newark, New Jersey. As a child, he attended Columbia High School located in Maplewood, New Jersey.

Eisenman transferred into the architecture school as an undergraduate at Cornell University and gave up his position on the swimming team in order to commit full-time to his studies. He received a Bachelor of Architecture degree from Cornell, a Master of Architecture degree from Columbia University, and MA and PhD degrees from the University of Cambridge. He received an honorary degree from Syracuse University School of Architecture in 2007.

== Career ==
Eisenman first rose to prominence as a member of the New York Five (also known as "the Whites"), along with fellow architects Charles Gwathmey, John Hejduk, Richard Meier, and Michael Graves. Some of their work was presented at a CASE Studies conference in 1969, catapulting their respective careers. Eisenman received a number of grants from the Graham Foundation for work done in this period. The New York Five began their careers by iterating on Le Corbusier's distinctive style, but they all subsequently developed unique styles and ideologies. Over time, the expansive, fragmentary, and disjointed aspects of Eisenman's work led to him being considered an early Deconstructivist, though he wished to distance himself from that label.

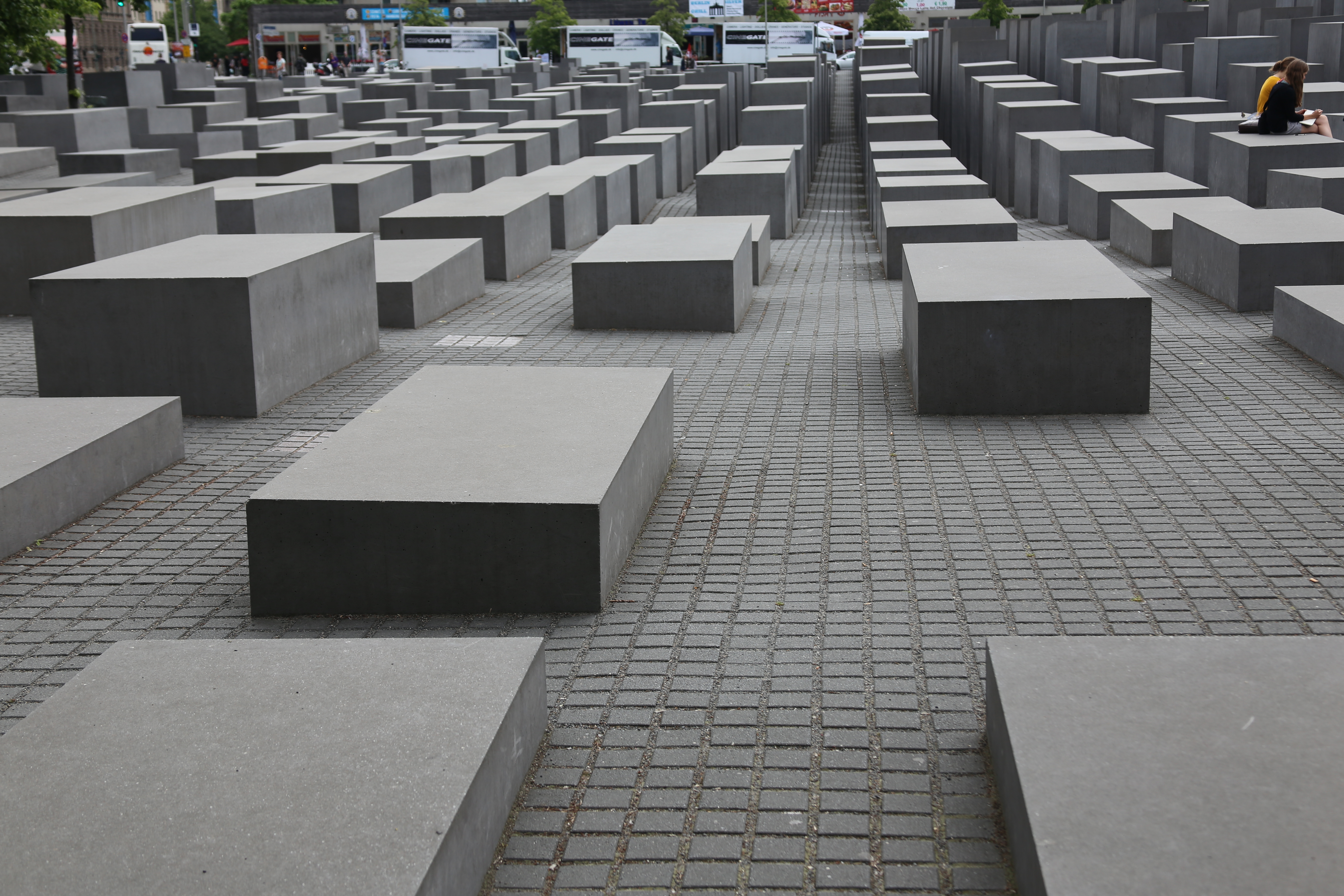
The Memorial to the Murdered Jews of Europe at the site of the gardens of the former Reich Chancellery in Berlin.

Eisenman currently teaches theory seminars and advanced design studios at the Yale School of Architecture, and is Professor Emeritus at the Cooper Union School of Architecture. Previously, he taught at the University of Cambridge, Harvard University, the University of Pennsylvania, Princeton University School of Architecture, and the Ohio State University. He founded the Institute for Architecture and Urban Studies in 1967 and served as its Executive Director until 1981.

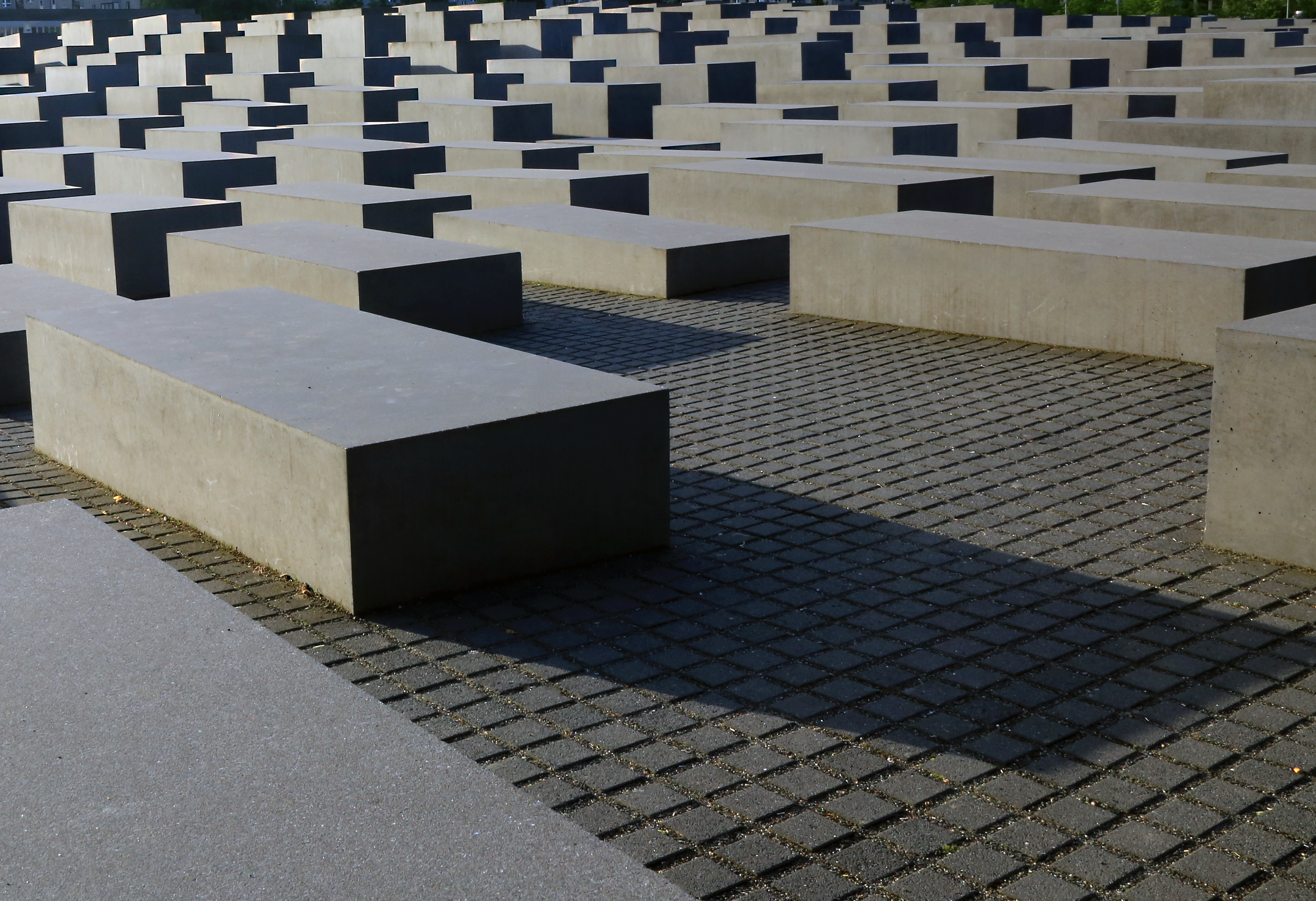
Another view of the Memorial to the Murdered Jews of Europe

His professional work is often referred to as formalist, deconstructive, late avant-garde, late and high modernist. The fragmenting of forms visible in some of his projects has been identified as characteristic of deconstructivism, and he has become one of the movement's flagbearers. In 1988, he was featured in the "Deconstructivists" exhibit at the Museum of Modern Art in New York.

While well known for his single-family residences, particularly his "House" series, he has also worked on several large-scale non-residential projects as well. Some examples include the Memorial to the Murdered Jews of Europe in Berlin and the State Farm Stadium for the Arizona Cardinals in Glendale, Arizona. His largest project to date is the City of Culture of Galicia in Santiago de Compostela, Spain. In his practice, Eisenman was an early advocate of computer-aided design, employing fledgling innovators such as Greg Lynn and Ingeborg Rocker as early as 1989.

His writings have pursued topics including comparative formal analyses; the emancipation and autonomization of architecture; and histories of Architects. Architects he has written about include Giuseppe Terragni, Andrea Palladio, Le Corbusier and James Stirling. Additionally, he is featured in wide print and many films, including the 2008 film Peter Eisenman: University of Phoenix Stadium for the Arizona Cardinals in which he provides a tour of his recent construction.

Eisenman has won several awards, including the National Design Award for Architecture in 2001, and the Wolf Prize in Arts in 2010.

== Criticism ==
Eisenman has received criticism for the state of some of his deconstructivist buildings. The Wexner Center, the first major public deconstructivist building, has required extensive and expensive retrofitting due to major design flaws, such as leaks, incompetent material specifications, and fine art exhibition space exposed to direct sunlight. It was frequently repeated that the Wexner's colliding planes tended to make its users disoriented to the point of physical nausea; in 1997 journalist Michael Pollan tracked the source of this rumor back to Eisenman himself. In architectural historian Andrew Ballantyne's opinion, "By some scale of values, he was actually enhancing the reputation of his building by letting it be known that it was hostile to humanity." Eisenman's House VI, designed for clients Richard and Suzanne Frank in the mid-1970s, also required several costly fixes resulting in the couple turning against Eisenman.

Eisenman has pursued dialogues with cultural figures internationally including his English mentor Colin Rowe, the Italian historian Manfredo Tafuri, George Baird, Fredric Jameson, Laurie Olin, Rosalind Krauss and Jacques Derrida.

== Buildings and works ==
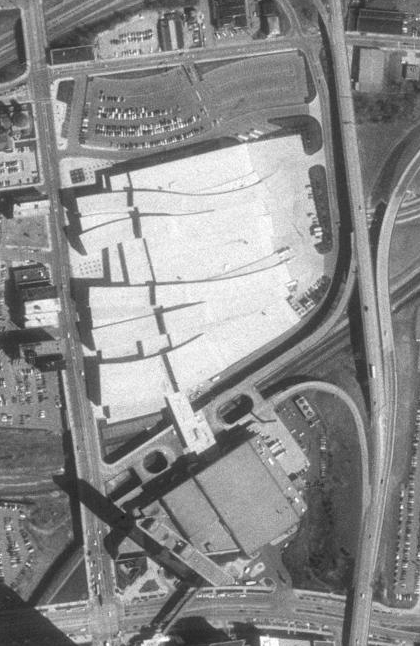
USGS satellite image of the Greater Columbus Convention Center

- House I, Princeton, New Jersey, 1968
- House II (Falk House), Hardwick, Vermont, 1969
- House III, Lakeville, Connecticut, 1971
- House IV, Falls Village, Connecticut, 1971
- House VI (Frank residence), Cornwall Connecticut, 1975
- House X, Bloomfield Hills, Michigan, 1975
- Brooklyn Firehouse, New York City, New York, 1985
- IBA Social Housing, Berlin, West Germany, 1985
- Wexner Center for the Arts, Ohio State University, Columbus, Ohio, 1989
- Koizumi Sangyo Headquarters, Tokyo, Japan, 1990
- Groningen Music-Video Pavilion, Groningen, Netherlands, 1990
- Nunotani building, Tokyo, Japan, 1992
- Greater Columbus Convention Center, Columbus, Ohio, 1993
- JCDecaux Bus Shelter, Aachen, Germany, 1996
- University of Cincinnati Arnoff Center, Cincinnati, Ohio, 1996
- City of Culture of Galicia, Santiago de Compostela, Galicia, Spain, 1999
- Il giardino dei passi perduti, Castelvecchio Museum, Verona, 2005 (temporary installation - now removed)
- Memorial to the Murdered Jews of Europe, Berlin, 2005
- State Farm Stadium, Glendale, Arizona, 2006
- Residenze Carlo Erba, with Degli Esposti Architetti, Milan, Italy, 2019

== Bibliography ==
- Eisenman, Peter (1987). Houses of cards. Rosalind E. Krauss, Manfredo Tafuri. New York: Oxford University Press. ISBN 978-0-19-505130-8.
- Eisenman, Peter (1999). Diagram diaries. New York, NY: Universe Pub. ISBN 978-0-7893-0264-9. OCLC 40668094.
- Blurred Zones: Investigations of the Interstitial : Eisenman Architects 1988-1998
- Eisenman, Peter; Terragni, Giuseppe; Tafuri, Manfredo (August 2003). Giuseppe Terragni: Transformations, Decompositions, Critiques. Monacelli. ISBN 978-1-885254-96-2.
- Eisenman, Peter (2004-05-10). Eisenman Inside Out: Selected Writings, 1963-1988. Yale University Press. ISBN 978-0-300-09008-6. OCLC 53276582.
- Eisenman, Peter (2008-04-29). Heid, Andrew; Lourie, Ariane (eds.). Ten Canonical Buildings: 1950-2000. Rizzoli, Distributed to the U.S. trade by Random House, Rizzoli International Publications, Incorporated. ISBN 978-0-8478-3048-0. OCLC 166387913.
- Peter Eisenman et al., Peter Eisenman: In dialogue with architects and philosophers (Vladan Djokić and Petar Bojanić (eds.)), Mimesis International. 2017, ISBN 9788869771132
- Peter Eisenman, Memory Games, Rizzoli. 1996 ISBN 978-0847818518
- Peter Eisenman and Elisa Iturbe, lateness 2020, Princeton University Press. ISBN 9780691147222
