= Werner Gantenbein =

Swiss architect (1924–2004)

- Born: 9 October 1924; Buchs, St. Gallen, Switzerland
- Died: 25 April 2004 (aged 79); Zumikon, Switzerland
- Education: ETH Zurich
- Occupation: Architect
- Buildings: Swiss pavilion, Expo 58, Brussels; Swiss pavilion, Expo 67, Montreal

Werner Gantenbein (9 October 1924 – 25 April 2004) was a Swiss architect. From 1953 he ran an architectural office in Zurich, and he built the Swiss pavilions for the world's fairs in Brussels in 1958 and Montreal in 1967.

== Biography ==
Werner Gantenbein was born on 9 October 1924 in Buchs, the son of Andreas Gantenbein, an architect and master builder (Baumeister), and his wife Anna. He studied architecture at ETH Zurich from 1945 to 1949. While still a student he won his first competition, for the cantonal penitentiary of Saxerriet in Salez. After working as an assistant to William Dunkel, he founded an architectural office in Zurich in 1953, with a branch in Buchs.

Gantenbein built public buildings as well as commercial and industrial buildings, some of them for the paper industry in Switzerland and its neighboring countries. He built the Swiss pavilions for the world's fairs in Brussels in 1958 (Expo 58) and in Montreal in 1967 (Expo 67). In Brussels, hexagonal elements lined up like a honeycomb symbolized the "Swiss character" (schweizerisches Wesen); in Montreal, a cubic building held a cinema for presenting Swiss art and industrial products. He received the city of Zurich's award for good buildings (Auszeichnung für gute Bauten in der Stadt Zürich) several times.

The pavilions of Belgium, Switzerland and Austria at Expo 67 in Montreal

Gantenbein made extensive study trips to Western Europe, North Africa, North America, China and Japan. He died in Zumikon on 25 April 2004.

== Bibliography ==
- Architektenlexikon der Schweiz 19./20. Jahrhundert, 1998, 203–204
