= 1966 in architecture =

The year 1966 in architecture involved some significant architectural events and new buildings.

== Events ==
- Complexity and Contradiction in Architecture by Robert Venturi is published, his first attack on modernist architecture.
- The National Historic Preservation Act of 1966 is passed by the United States Congress and signed into law, forming much of the foundation of architectural renovation and rehabilitation in that country.
- Construction begins on the World Trade Center in Lower Manhattan, New York.

== Buildings and structures ==
=== Buildings opened ===
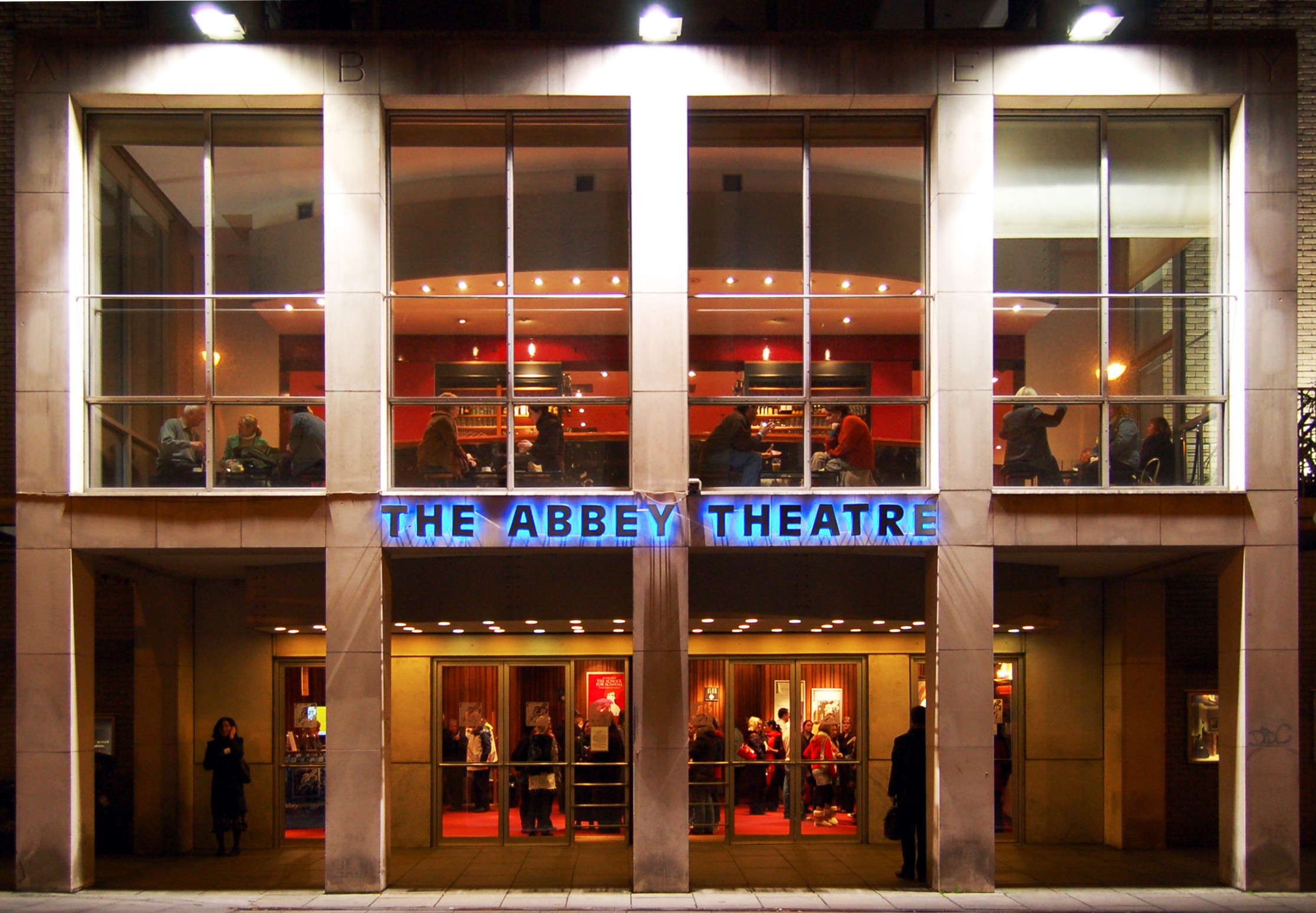
New Abbey Theatre, Dublin, Ireland

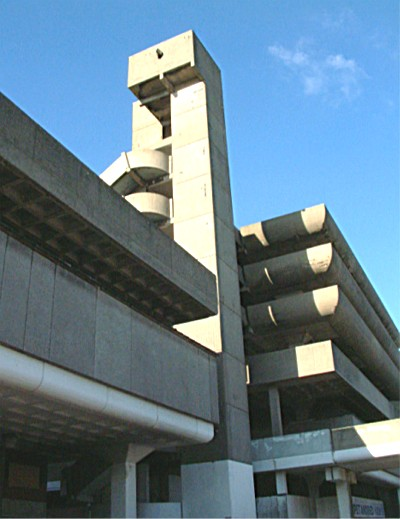
Tricorn Centre, Portsmouth

- February 14 – CN Tower (Edmonton), the first skyscraper in the city of Edmonton, and tallest building in Western Canada until 1971.
- March
  - Dunelm House, Durham, England, designed by Richard Raines of Architects' Co-Partnership.
  - Hotel des Dromonts, Avoriaz, France, designed by Jacques Labro.
- June – Foothills Medical Centre, Calgary, Alberta, Canada, opens as the largest new hospital in North America.
- July 3 – Church of Mariä Heimsuchung, Wiesbaden, designed by Johannes Lackel.
- July 18 – New Abbey Theatre, Dublin, designed by former actor Michael Scott.
- c. August 31 – Tricorn Centre in Portsmouth, England, designed by Owen Luder and Rodney Gordon.
- September 8 – Severn Bridge in Britain.

=== Buildings completed ===
- October 28 – The Gateway Arch in St Louis, Missouri, United States, designed by Eero Saarinen.
- December – GPO Tower (Birmingham), England.
- Brutalist showroom of jeweller Andrew Grima at 80 Jermyn Street, St James's, London (demolished 1986).
- New Hall, Cambridge, England, designed by Chamberlin, Powell and Bon (modern-day Murray Edwards College).
- Church of St Peter, Klippan, Sweden, by Sigurd Lewerentz.
- Kaleva Church in Tampere, Finland, designed by Reima and Raili Pietilä.
- Fire Station Number 4 in Columbus, Indiana, by Robert Venturi.
- Whitney Museum of American Art on Madison Avenue in New York City, by Marcel Breuer with Hamilton P. Smith.
- Creek Vean (private residence), Feock, Cornwall, England, designed by Team 4.
- Lovejoy Plaza in Portland, Oregon, by Lawrence Halprin, is designed.

== Awards ==
- AIA Gold Medal – Kenzo Tange.
- RAIA Gold Medal – William Laurie.
- RIBA Royal Gold Medal – Ove Arup.
- Grand Prix de Rome, architecture – Bernard Schoebel.

== Births ==
- September – David Adjaye, Tanzanian-born British architect
- date unknown – Winka Dubbeldam, Dutch American architect

== Deaths ==
- May 24 – Hans Hansen, German architect and theorist (born 1889)
- November 15 – Aymar Embury II, American architect (born 1880)
