= John Rauch (architect) =

American architect (1930–2022)

- Born: October 23, 1930; Philadelphia, Pennsylvania, U.S
- Died: August 16, 2022 (aged 91); West Chester, Pennsylvania, U.S.
- Education: Wesleyan University; University of Pennsylvania
- Occupation: Architect
- Organization(s): Venturi, Rauch & Scott Brown
- Awards: John Frederick Harbeson Award

John Keiser Rauch Jr. (October 23, 1930 – August 16, 2022) was an American architect. He was a co-founder of the firm Venturi, Rauch & Scott Brown, with Robert Venturi and Denise Scott Brown.

== Early life and education ==
John K. Rauch Jr. was born on October 23, 1930, in Philadelphia, Pennsylvania. In 1948, he graduated from Lower Rancocas Valley Regional High School in Mount Holly. As a young man, Rauch helped his father in building a log cabin in Medford Lakes. This and other work in construction as a teenager inspired his interest in architecture and construction as an adult.

Rauch attended Wesleyan University for two years. In 1951, he left and joined the Army where he served as a military policeman. Rauch graduated from the University of Pennsylvania with a BA in Architecture in 1958.

== Career ==
In the summer of 1956, Rauch worked as a draftsman at an architectural firm in Pennsauken, New Jersey. In the summer of 1957, he worked for an architect in Ocean City, New Jersey. In 1958, Rauch moved to Philadelphia for fulltime employment at the firm of Cope & Lippincott, where he worked from 1958 to 1961. In 1961, he joined the firm Venturi & Short in Philadelphia.

In 1964, Rauch and Robert Venturi founded the firm of Venturi & Rauch. Rauch and Venturi designed the influential Vanna Venturi House and Fire Station #4. Brown joined the firm in 1969.

Rauch was instrumental in the selection of educational institution commissions for Yale, Princeton, and Ohio State University.

He helped design and realize Guild House (1964), the Institute for Scientific Information headquarters (1979), and the Trubek and Wislocki Houses (1971).

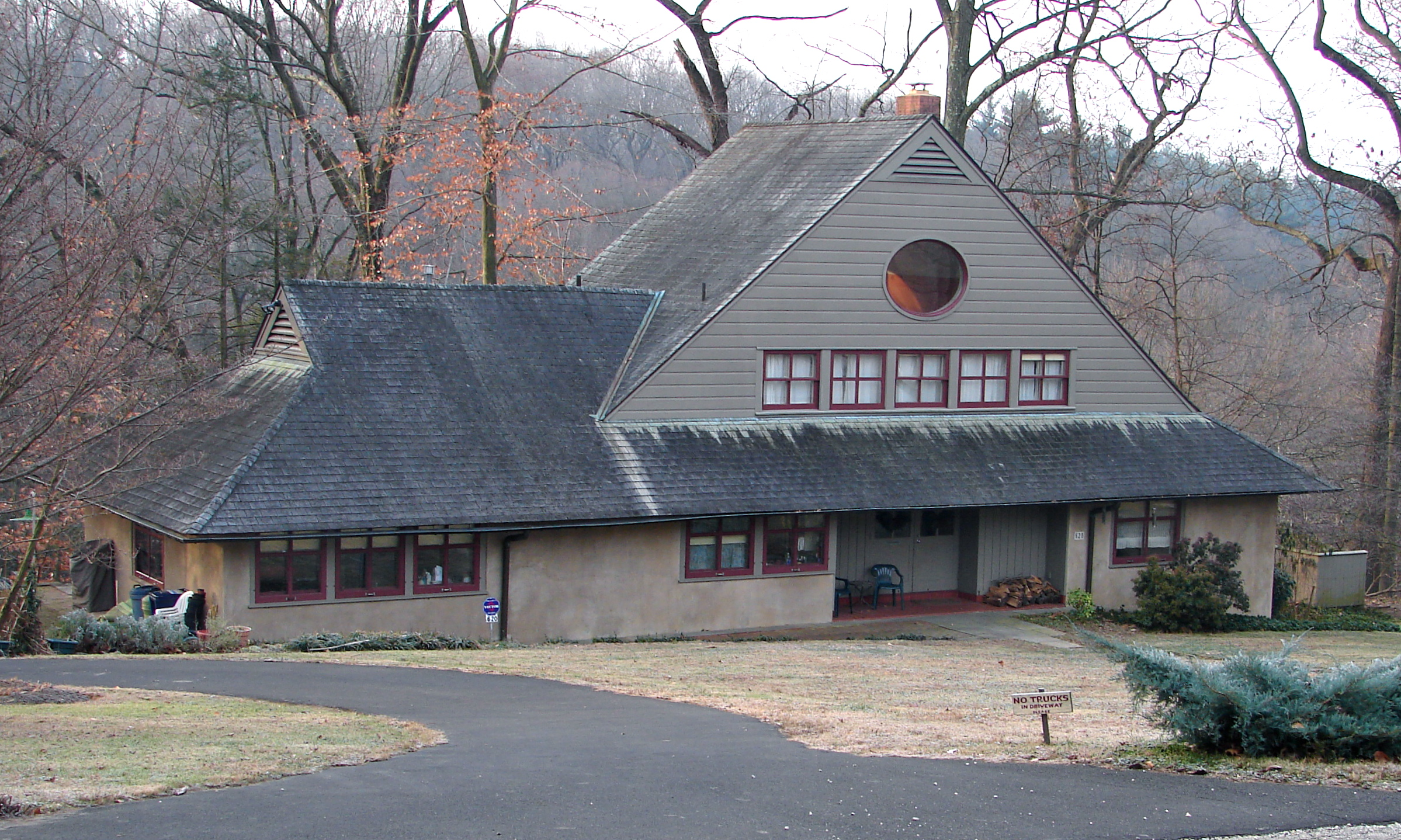
John Rauch House in Chestnut Hill, Philadelphia

Rauch resigned as partner in 1987. He consulted for the firm in 1988 and 1989.

In retirement, Rauch painted regularly, focusing on landscapes.

After his death, he was called “one of the unsung heroes of postwar American architecture” by the Architectural Record.

== Awards and honors ==
In 1992, Rauch received the John Frederick Harbeson Award from the Philadelphia chapter of the American Institute of Architects.

== Personal life ==
Rauch married Carol Pfaff in 1953. They had three sons and two daughters. They divorced in 1977. In 1981, he married Carol McConochie. Rauch died aged 91 on August 16, 2022, in West Chester.
