= John Rauch (disambiguation) =

John Rauch (1927–2008) was an American football player and coach.

John Rauch may also refer to:

- John Henry Rauch (1828–1894), American sanitarian
- John Rauch (architect) (1930–2022), American architect
- John T. Rauch (fl. 1989–2021), U.S. Air Force general

== See also ==
- Johannes Rauch
- Jon Rauch (born 1978), former baseball pitcher
- Jonathan Rauch (born 1960), American journalist
