= Learning from Las Vegas =

Postmodernist architecture book

- Author: Robert Venturi, Denise Scott Brown, and Steven Izenour
- Cover artist: Muriel Cooper
- Publisher: MIT Press
- English publication date: 1972
- ISBN: 978-0-262-22015-6
- Website: mitpress.mit.edu/books/learning-las-vegas-facsimile-edition

Learning from Las Vegas is a 1972 book by Robert Venturi, Denise Scott Brown, and Steven Izenour. Translated into 18 languages, the book helped foster the development of postmodern architecture.

== Compilation ==
In March 1968, Robert Venturi, writer of Complexity and Contradiction in Architecture, and Denise Scott Brown wrote and published "A Significance for A&P Parking Lots, or Learning from Las Vegas" (Architectural Forum, March 1968). That following fall, the two created a research studio for graduate students at Yale School of Art and Architecture. The studio was called "Learning from Las Vegas, or Form Analysis as Design Research".

Izenour, a graduate student in the studio, accompanied his senior tutor colleagues, Venturi and Scott Brown, to Las Vegas in 1968 together with nine students of architecture and four planning and graphics students to study the urban form of the city.

Las Vegas was regarded as a "non-city" and as an outgrowth of a "strip", along which were placed parking lots and singular frontages for gambling casinos, hotels, churches and bars. The research group studied various aspects of the city, including the commercial vernacular, lighting, patterns, styles, and symbolism in the architecture. Venturi and Scott Brown created a taxonomy for the forms, signs, and symbols they encountered. The two were inspired by the emphasis on sign and symbol they found on the Las Vegas strip. The result was a critique of Modern architecture, demonstrated most famously in the comparison between the "duck" and "decorated shed."

The "duck" represents a large part of modernist architecture, which was expressive in form and volume. In contrast, the "decorated shed" relies on imagery and sign. Virtually all architecture before the Modern Movement used decoration to convey meaning, often profound but sometimes simply perfunctory, such as the signage on medieval shop fronts. Only Modernist architecture eschewed such ornament, relying only on corporeal or structural elements to convey meaning. As such, argued the authors, Modern buildings became mute and vacuous, especially when built for corporate or government clients.

== Reception ==
Learning from Las Vegas caused a stir in the architectural world upon its publication, as it was hailed by progressive critics for its bold indictment of Modernism, and by the status quo as blasphemous. A split among young American architects occurred during the 1970s, with Izenour, Venturi, Robert A.M. Stern, Charles Moore, and Allan Greenberg defending the book as "The Greys", and Richard Meier, Peter Eisenman, John Hejduk, and Michael Graves writing against its premises as "The Whites." It became associated with post-modernism when magazines such as Progressive Architecture published articles citing its influence on the younger generation. Tom Wolfe's often-pilloried book, From Bauhaus to Our House, praises Venturi, Scott Brown, and Izenour for their stand against heroic Modernism.

=== Exhibition ===
From October 29, 2009, to February 5, 2010, "What We Learned: The Yale Las Vegas Studio" and "The Work of Venturi, Scott Brown & Associates" were exhibited at the Yale School of Architecture gallery, with about 100 photographs taken during the October 1968 trip that would underpin the research by Venturi and Scott Brown. The exhibitions were accompanied by an informational leaflet and interview. "What We Learned" originated at the Museum im Bellpark (Kriens, Switzerland) and had been exhibited at the Deutsches Architekturmuseum in Frankfurt, Germany.

== Publication history ==
The authors felt the original 1972 edition was "too monumental for a text that praised the ugly and ordinary over the heroic and monumental" and offered a revised edition, later published as a more modest paperback in 1977. The original 1972 large-format edition was designed by Muriel Cooper for MIT Press and became a design icon in its own right after it fell out of print. In 2017, MIT Press began offering a facsimile edition of the 1972 original with a preface by Denise Scott Brown explaining the reservations the authors had with the original edition. The cost of the first edition was also cited as a reason to allow Mr. Venturi and Ms. Scott Brown to redesign the book.

- Venturi, Robert; Scott Brown, Denise; Izenour, Steven (1972). Learning from Las Vegas. Cambridge MA: MIT Press. ISBN 978-0-262-22015-6.
- Venturi, Robert; Scott Brown, Denise; Izenour, Steven (May 1977). Learning From Las Vegas (Revised ed.). MIT Press. ISBN 978-0-262-22020-0. 192 pp.; hc, 9 in × 6 in (230 mm × 150 mm)
- Venturi, Robert; Scott Brown, Denise; Izenour, Steven (June 1977). Learning From Las Vegas (Revised ed.). MIT Press. ISBN 978-0-262-72006-9. 192 pp.; pb, 9 in × 6 in (230 mm × 150 mm)
- Venturi, Robert; Scott Brown, Denise; Izenour, Steven (September 2017). Learning From Las Vegas (Facsimile ed.). MIT Press. ISBN 978-0-262-03696-2. 216 pp.; hc, 14 in × 10.5 in (360 mm × 270 mm)
