= Steven Izenour =

American architect

- Born: July 16, 1940; New Haven, CT
- Died: August 21, 2001 (aged 61); Vermont
- Education: University of Pennsylvania, Yale University
- Occupation: Architect
- Father: George Izenour
- Practice: Venturi, Scott Brown & Associates
- Buildings: George D. Widener Memorial Treehouse, Philadelphia Zoo, Houston Children's Museum, George Izenour House

Steven Izenour (July 16, 1940 in New Haven – August 21, 2001 in Vermont) was an American architect, urbanist and theorist. He is best known as co-author, with Robert Venturi and Denise Scott Brown, of Learning from Las Vegas, one of the most influential architectural theory books of the twentieth century. He was also a principal in the Philadelphia firm Venturi, Scott Brown & Associates.

He was born in New Haven, Connecticut, where his father George Izenour, a theatre stage and lighting designer, taught at Yale University and later had a consulting firm. His mother was Hildegard Hilt. In 1964, Izenour married Elisabeth Margit Gemmill.

== Education and teaching ==
Izenour studied art history at Swarthmore College and architecture at the University of Pennsylvania, before earning a Master of Environmental Design in 1969 at Yale University. After completing his degree at Yale, he ran the "Learning from Las Vegas" design studio for a time for Bob Venturi. Next he worked in Charles Moore's architectural office in New Haven for a year or two.

In the late 1960s/early 1970s, he moved with his wife, Elisabeth Margit Gemmill, and their two children (Ann-Kristin and Tessa) back to Philadelphia. There he reunited with Bob Venturi, John Rauch, and Denise Scott-Brown. "He was a unique spirit from the get-go," Ms. Scott-Brown said. "The rebellious maverick side of our work appealed to him." She credits him with the nickname, "Big Tuna around the office."

In addition to teaching at Yale University, Izenour also taught at the University of Pennsylvania and Drexel University in Philadelphia.

== Learning from Las Vegas ==
While a grad student at Yale, Izenour assisted Robert Venturi as a TA in 1968 for a studio course and research project titled "Learning from Las Vegas, or Form Analysis as Design Research". They eventually wrote a book based on their findings from the research" Learning from Las Vegas, first published in 1972. It was published in a revised edition in 1977, titled Learning from Las Vegas. The Forgotten Symbolism of Architectural Form.

As part of the research, Izenour had accompanied his senior tutor colleagues, Venturi and Scott Brown, to Las Vegas, Nevada in 1968, together with nine students of architecture and two planning and two graphics students, to study the urban form of the city. It was generally regarded at that time as a "non-city"; rather, as the outgrowth of "strip" development, along which were placed parking lots and separate frontages for gambling casinos, hotels, churches, and bars. Venturi, Scott Brown and Izenour had previously visited Las Vegas, and written a joint article, "A significance for A&P parking lots, or learning from Las Vegas" (1968).

The research group studied various aspects of the city, including its symbolism, the lighting, "pattern books", "styles" and "illusion/allusion". They concluded that, in a city like Las Vegas, symbolism carries greater importance than architectural form. They identified this distinction as what they called the difference between "ducks" and "decorated sheds." Most modernist architecture, the authors said, used expressive mass and volume to convey meaning, like the famous "Long Island Duckling" on Long Island, New York. But in a place like Las Vegas, the more common "decorated sheds" relied on imagery and signs to do much the same thing. Virtually all architecture prior to the Modern Movement used such decoration to convey meaning, often profound but sometimes perfunctory, such as the signage on medieval shop fronts. Only Modernist architecture eschewed such ornament, relying only on its corporeal or structural elements to convey meaning. As such, it became mute and often vacuous, especially when built for corporate or government clients.

Learning from Las Vegas caused a stir in the architectural world when published. Progressive critics took it as a bold indictment of Modernism; mainline practitioners found it blasphemous. A split among young American architects occurred during the 1970s, with Izenour, Venturi, Robert A.M. Stern, Charles Moore and Allan Greenberg defended the book as "The Greys," and modernists Richard Meier, Peter Eisenman, John Heyduk, and Michael Graves wrote against its premises as "The Whites." It became associated with post-modernism when magazines such as Progressive Architecture published articles citing its influence on the younger generation. When Tom Wolfe published his critical book, From Bauhaus to Our House, Venturi, Scott Brown and Izenour were among those architects the author praised for their stand against heroic Modernism.

== White Towers ==
In 1979, continuing his studies into the relationship of architecture and pop culture, Izenour and fellow architect Paul Hirshorn published a monograph about the White Tower Hamburgers fast food chain. Their book contained selected photographs taken in a variety of styles—from the stark and deadpan to family album-like snapshots. In an affectionately written introductory essay, Hirshorn and Izenour described the identifiable and idiosyncratic commercial architectural style of the 1930s and 1940s, and documented the development of the White Tower's architecture and stylistic variations. They used interviews with former White Tower employees, including Charles Johnson, White Tower's architect for over forty years, to set their analysis of the buildings within a broader context of corporate culture, mass marketing, and the rise of franchising in the twentieth century.

== Learning from the Wildwoods ==
Similar to the Las Vegas studies, in the 1990s Izenour started university courses for the study and preservation of 1950s Doo Wop architecture in Wildwood, New Jersey, a Shore community. In association with the University of Pennsylvania, Yale University, and Kent State University, he came up with the Wildwoods Redevelopment Plan. It established a foundation to revitalize the beach resort.
