= Complexity and Contradiction in Architecture =

Book by Robert Venturi

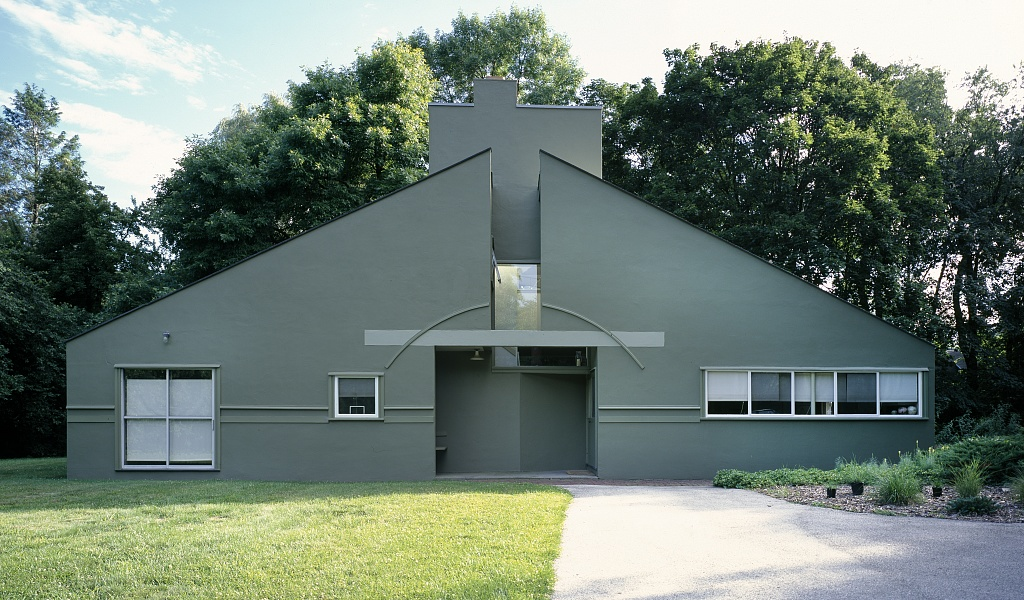
- Vanna Venturi House: an epitome of Complexity and Contradiction in Architecture.
- Author: Robert Venturi
- Language: English
- Subject: Architecture
- English publication date: 1966

Complexity and Contradiction in Architecture is a book by the American architect Robert Venturi. It was first published in 1966 by Museum of Modern Art in New York City and has since been translated into 16 languages, and is considered one of the most important works of architectural literature. Architectural historian Vincent Scully has singled it out as "probably the most important text on architecture since Le Corbusier's Toward an Architecture in 1923".

Complexity and Contradiction in Architecture marks a turning point in American architecture and architectural theory. In the early 1980s, Philip Johnson declared, with extravagant insouciance: "Venturi is the most important architect in the world today... He revolutionized architecture with Complexity and Contradiction in the 1960s. He freed us; he untied the chains with one stroke."

== Content ==
Two very famous quotes from the book, in response to Ludwig Mies van der Rohe's Less is more, are More is not less and Less is a bore.

The book demonstrated, through countless examples, an approach to understanding architectural composition and complexity, and the resulting richness and interest. Citing vernacular as well as high-style sources, Venturi drew new lessons from the buildings of architects familiar (Michelangelo, Alvar Aalto) and, at the time, forgotten (Frank Furness, Edwin Lutyens). He made a case for "the difficult whole" rather than the diagrammatic forms popular at the time, and included examples —both built and unrealized— of his own work to demonstrate the possible application of such techniques.

Most of the book was written in 1962 under a grant from the Graham Foundation, and is seen as a postmodern response to the purism of modernism.

The book ends with twelve of Venturi’s own designs—including the Vanna Venturi House and Guild House—to illustrate his theories.

The book consists of 11 chapters:

1. Nonstraightforward Architecture: A Gentle Manifesto
2. Complexity and Contradiction vs. Simplification or Picturesqueness
3. Ambiguity
4. Contradictory Levels: The Phenomenon of "Both-And" in Architecture
5. Contradictory Levels Continued: The Double-Functioning Element
6. Accommodation and the Limitations of Order: The Conventional Element
7. Contradiction Adapted
8. Contradiction Juxtaposed
9. The Inside and the Outside
10. The Obligation Toward the Difficult Whole
11. Works

== Awards ==
Complexity and Contradiction in Architecture was awarded the 1978 Medal of the American Institute of Architects.

== Impact ==
The book made Robert Venturi a father figure for postmodern architects. However, in 2001, Venturi stated that he had never been a postmodernist.

== See also ==
- Learning from Las Vegas
