= Abrams House (Pittsburgh) =

- Location within Pittsburgh

General information
- Type: Residence
- Architectural style: Postmodern
- Location: 118-A Woodland Rd., Pittsburgh, Pennsylvania, United States
- Coordinates: 40°26′43″N 79°55′18″W
- Construction started: 1979
- Completed: 1982
- Demolished: 2022

Design and construction
- Architect: Robert Venturi
- Architecture firm: Venturi, Scott Brown and Associates

The Abrams House was an architecturally notable residence in the Squirrel Hill neighborhood of Pittsburgh, Pennsylvania. It was built in 1979–82 and was considered Pittsburgh's earliest example of Postmodern architecture. The house was designed by postmodernist pioneer Robert Venturi, who called the design "one of the best that has come out of our office".

The house was commissioned by retirees Betty and Irving Abrams, who were inspired by the nearby Frank House to commission an architecturally bold residence. It was constructed on a subdivided lot directly behind another notable house, the Giovannitti House, with which it shares a driveway. Construction of the Giovannitti House was partially funded by the sale of land for the Abrams House. The house sat on a private drive called Woodland Road which runs adjacent to Chatham University and contains a number of notable residences.

When Betty Abrams died in 2018, the house was purchased by the owners of the neighboring Giovannitti House, who planned to demolish it. In order to block the demolition, the Abrams House was nominated as a Pittsburgh historic landmark by the Pittsburgh History and Landmarks Foundation in December 2018, but the nomination was rejected by the Pittsburgh City Council due to the poor condition of the house and its location in an area inaccessible to the general public.

The house was of frame and masonry construction with a distinctive wavelike roof. The front elevation featured a large, irregular window wrapping around and over the main entrance which combined stepped rectangular forms with radiating spokes that continued in a painted green and white sunburst pattern over much of the wall surface. A high ribbon window wrapped around the other sides of the house. The interior was painted in white and primary colors and was decorated with a large mural by Roy Lichtenstein.

As of late November 2022, the house had been demolished.
