= Robert Venturi =

American architect (1925–2018)

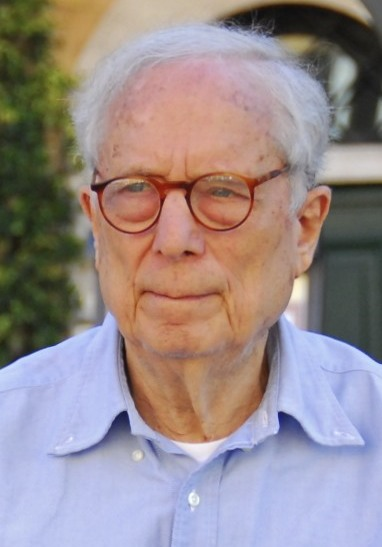
- Venturi in 2008
- Born: Robert Charles Venturi Jr. June 25, 1925; Philadelphia, Pennsylvania, U.S.
- Died: September 18, 2018 (aged 93); Philadelphia, Pennsylvania, U.S.
- Education: Princeton University
- Occupation: Architect
- Spouse: Denise Scott Brown (m. 1967)
- Children: James Venturi
- Awards: Pritzker Prize (1991); Vincent Scully Prize (2002); AIA Gold Medal (2016)
- Practice: Venturi, Scott Brown and Associates; Venturi and Rauch; Venturi, Rauch and Scott Brown

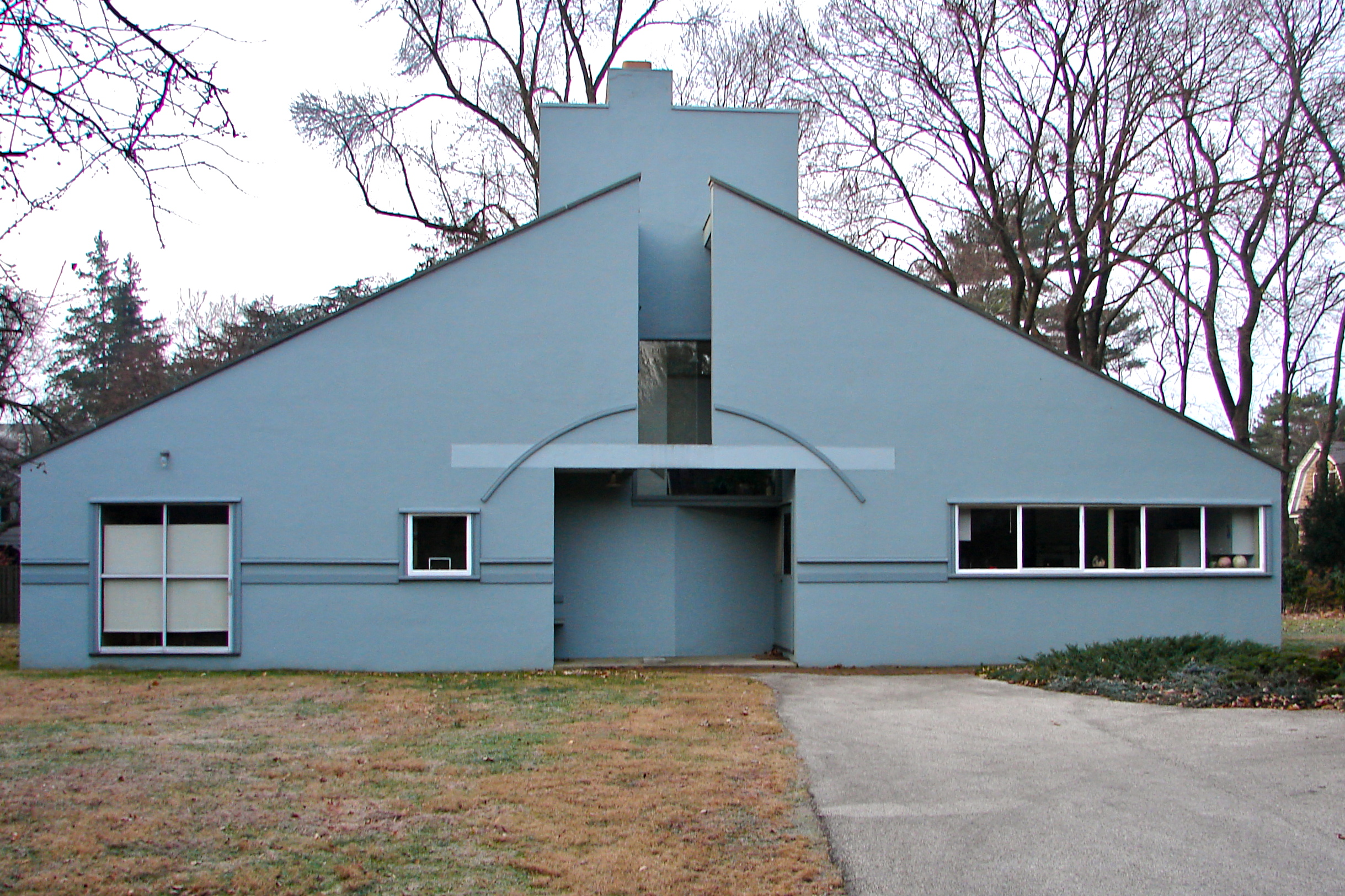
Vanna Venturi House

Robert Charles Venturi Jr. (June 25, 1925 – September 18, 2018) was an American architect, founding principal of the firm Venturi, Scott Brown and Associates.

Together with his wife and partner, Denise Scott Brown, he helped shape the way that architects, planners and students experience and think about architecture and the built environment. Their buildings, planning, theoretical writings, and teaching have also contributed to the expansion of discourse about architecture.

Venturi was awarded the Pritzker Prize in Architecture in 1991; the prize was awarded to him alone, despite a request to include his equal partner, Scott Brown. Subsequently, a group of women architects attempted to get her name added retroactively to the prize, but the Pritzker Prize jury declined to do so. Venturi coined the maxim "Less is a bore", a postmodern antidote to Mies van der Rohe's famous modernist dictum "Less is more". Venturi lived in Philadelphia with Denise Scott Brown. He is the father of James Venturi, founder and principal of ReThink Studio.

== Early life and education ==
Venturi was born in Philadelphia to Robert Venturi Sr. and Vanna (née Luizi) Venturi, and was raised as a Quaker. Venturi attended school at the Episcopal Academy in Merion, Pennsylvania. He graduated summa cum laude from Princeton University in 1947 where he was a member-elect of Phi Beta Kappa and won the D'Amato Prize in Architecture. He received his M.F.A. from Princeton in 1950. The educational program at Princeton under Professor Jean Labatut, who offered provocative design studios within a Beaux-Arts pedagogical framework, was a key factor in Venturi's development of an approach to architectural theory and design that drew from architectural history and commercial architecture in analytical, as opposed to stylistic, terms. In 1951 he briefly worked under Eero Saarinen in Bloomfield Hills, Michigan, and later for Louis Kahn in Philadelphia. He was awarded the Rome Prize Fellowship at the American Academy in Rome in 1954, where he studied and toured Europe for two years.

From 1959 to 1967, Venturi held teaching positions at the University of Pennsylvania, where he served as Kahn's teaching assistant, an instructor, and later, as associate professor. It was there, in 1960, that he met fellow faculty member, architect and planner Denise Scott Brown. Venturi taught later at the Yale School of Architecture and was a visiting lecturer with Scott Brown in 2003 at the Graduate School of Design at Harvard University.

== Career ==
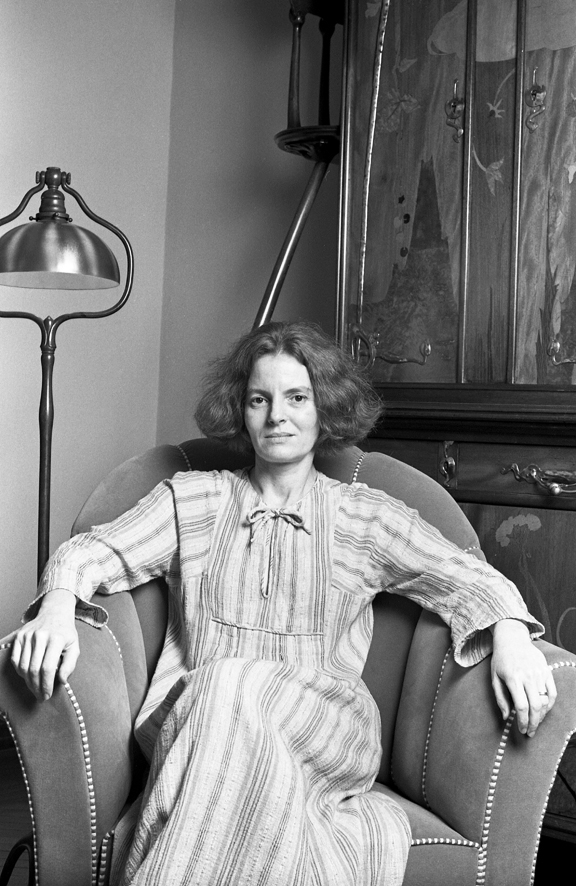
Venturi's wife and business partner Denise Scott Brown, 1978

A controversial critic of what he saw as the blithely functionalist and symbolically vacuous architecture of corporate modernism during the 1950s, Venturi was one of the first architects to question some of the premises of the Modern Movement. He published his "gentle manifesto", Complexity and Contradiction in Architecture in 1966; in its introduction, Vincent Scully called it "probably the most important writing on the making of architecture since Le Corbusier's Vers Une Architecture of 1923." The work was derived from course lectures at the University of Pennsylvania, and Venturi received a grant from the Graham Foundation in 1965 to aid in its completion. The book demonstrated, through countless examples, an approach to understanding architectural composition and complexity, and the resulting richness and interest. Citing vernacular as well as high-style sources, Venturi drew new lessons from the buildings of architects familiar (Michelangelo, Alvar Aalto) and, at the time, forgotten (Frank Furness, Edwin Lutyens). He made a case for "the difficult whole" rather than the diagrammatic forms popular at the time, and included examples — both built and unrealized — of his work to demonstrate the possible application of such techniques. The book has been published in 18 languages to date.

Immediately hailed as a theorist and designer with radical ideas, Venturi went to teach a series of studios at the Yale School of Architecture in the mid-1960s. The most famous of these was a studio in 1968 in which Venturi and Scott Brown, together with Steven Izenour, led a team of students to document and analyze the Las Vegas Strip, perhaps the least likely subject for a serious research project imaginable. In 1972, Venturi, Scott Brown and Izenour published the folio, A Significance for A&P Parking Lots, or Learning from Las Vegas. It was revised using the student work as a foil for new theory, and reissued in 1977 as Learning from Las Vegas: the Forgotten Symbolism of Architectural Form. This second manifesto was an even more stinging rebuke to orthodox modernism and elite architectural tastes. The book coined the terms "Duck" and "Decorated Shed", descriptions of the two predominant ways of embodying iconography in buildings. The work of Venturi, Scott Brown, and John Rauch adopted the latter strategy, producing formally simple "decorated sheds" with rich, complex, and often shocking ornamental flourishes. Venturi and his wife co-wrote several more books at the end of the century, but these two have so far proved to be the most influential.

== Architecture ==
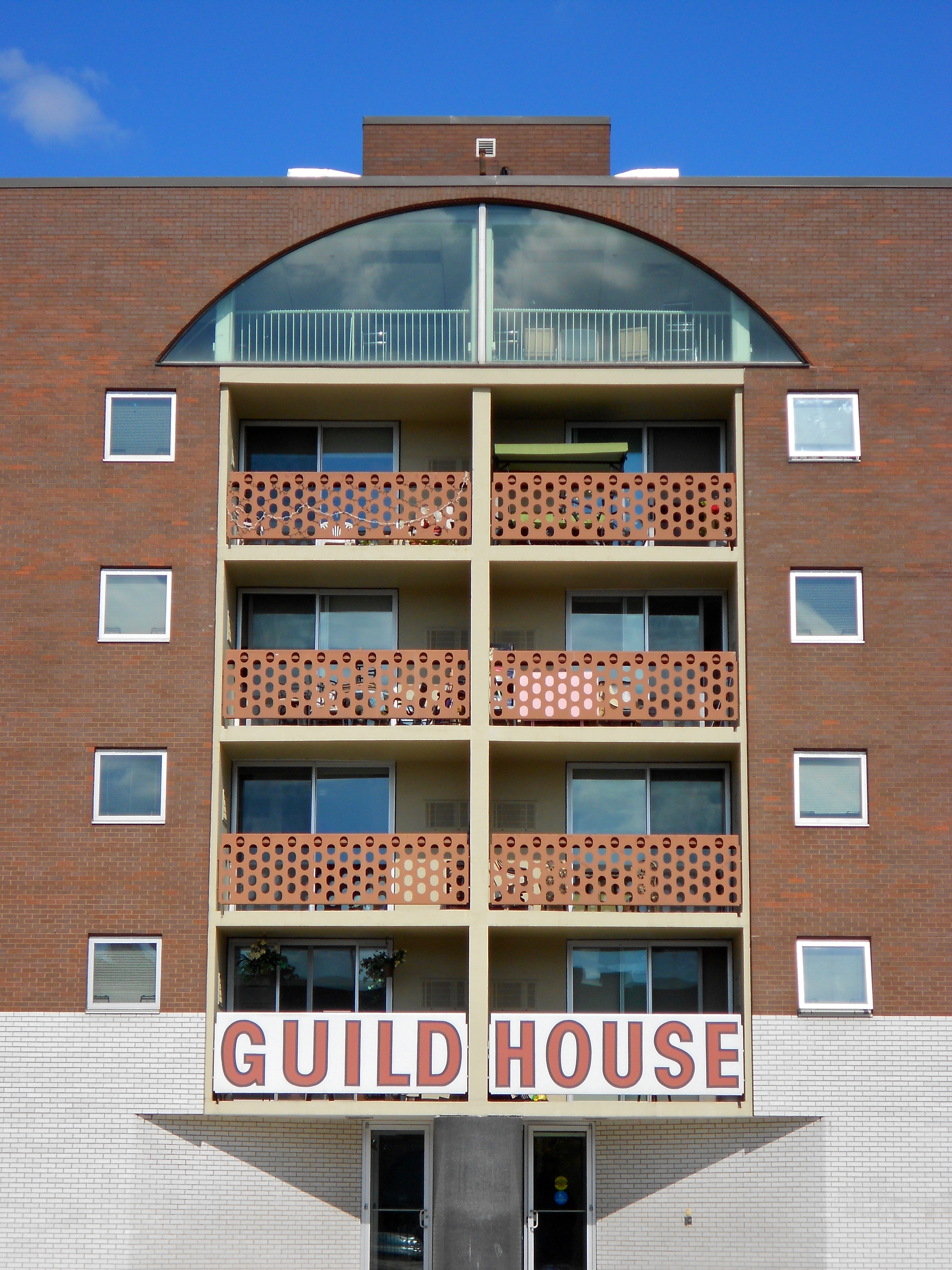
The Guild House, completed 1964, on Spring Garden Street in Philadelphia

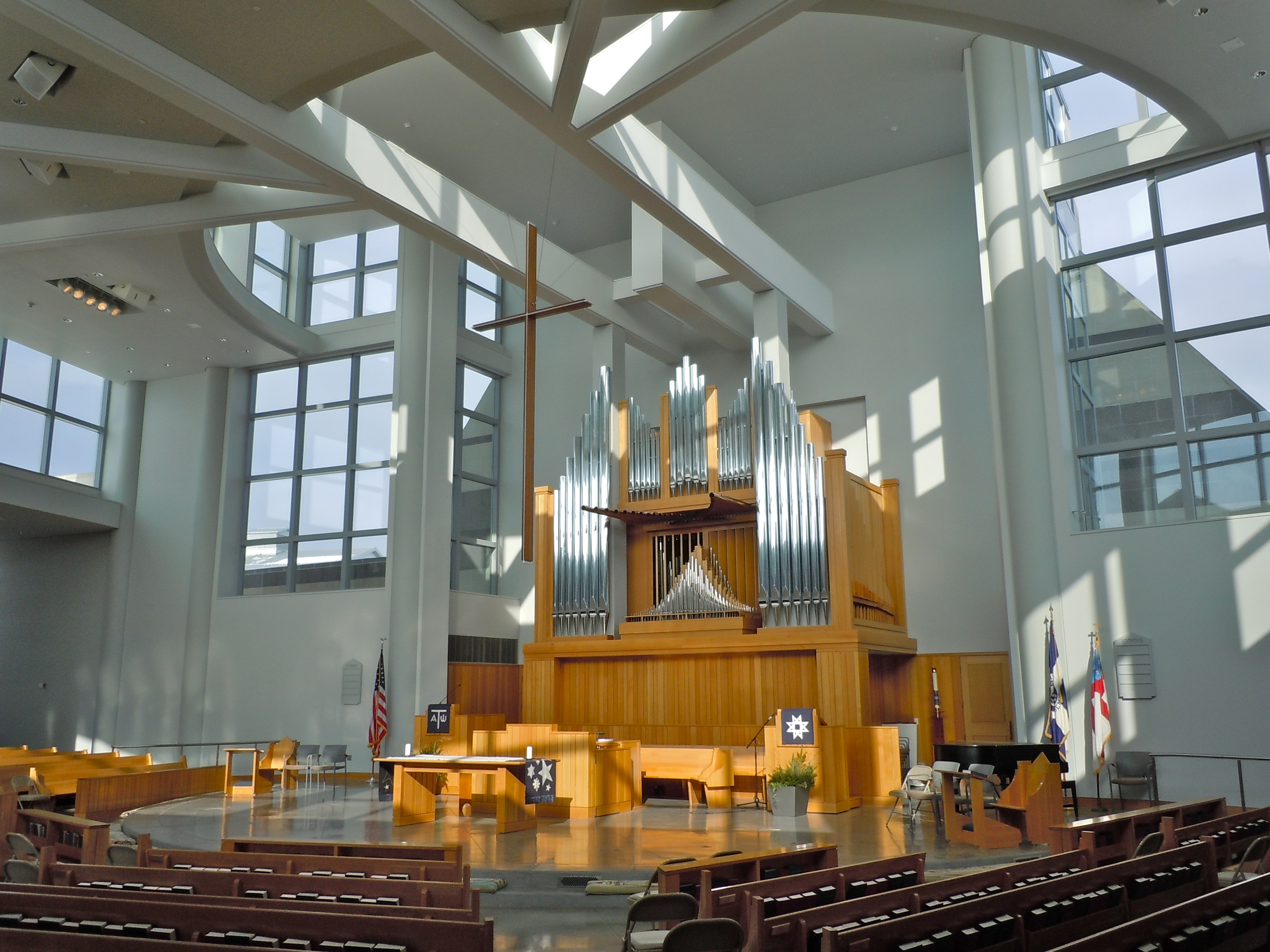
Chapel at the Episcopal Academy in Newtown Square, Pennsylvania (2010)

The architecture of Robert Venturi, although perhaps not as familiar today as his books, helped redirect American architecture away from a widely practiced modernism in the 1960s to a more exploratory design approach that openly drew lessons from architectural history and responded to the everyday context of the American city. Venturi's buildings typically juxtapose architectural systems, elements and aims, to acknowledge the conflicts often inherent in a project or site. This "inclusive" approach contrasted with the typical modernist effort to resolve and unify all factors in a complete and rigidly structured—and possibly less functional and more simplistic—work of art. The diverse range of buildings of Venturi's early career offered surprising alternatives to then current architectural practice, with "impure" forms (such as the North Penn Visiting Nurses Headquarters), apparently casual asymmetries (as at the Vanna Venturi House), and pop-style supergraphics and geometries (for instance, the Lieb House).

Venturi created the firm Venturi and Short with William Short in 1960. In his architectural design Venturi was influenced by early masters such as Michelangelo and Palladio, and modern masters including Le Corbusier, Alvar Aalto, Louis Kahn and Eero Saarinen. After John Rauch replaced Short as partner in 1964, the firm's name changed to Venturi and Rauch. Venturi married Denise Scott Brown on July 23, 1967, in Santa Monica, California, and in 1969, Scott Brown joined the firm as partner in charge of planning. In 1980, The firm's name became Venturi, Rauch, and Scott Brown, and after Rauch's resignation in 1989, Venturi, Scott Brown, and Associates. The firm, based in Manayunk, Philadelphia, was awarded the Architecture Firm Award by the American Institute of Architects in 1985. The practice's recent work includes many commissions from academic institutions, including campus planning and university buildings, and civic buildings in London, Toulouse, and Japan.

Venturi's architecture has had worldwide influence, beginning in the late 1960s with the dissemination of the broken-gable roof of the Vanna Venturi House and the segmentally arched window and interrupted string courses of Guild House. The playful variations on vernacular house types seen in the Trubeck and Wislocki Houses offered a new way to embrace, but transform, familiar forms. The facade patterning of the Allen Memorial Art Museum in Oberlin and the laboratory buildings demonstrated a treatment of the vertical surfaces of buildings that is both decorative and abstract, drawing from vernacular and historic architecture while still being modern. Venturi's work arguably provided a key influence at important times in the careers of architects Robert A. M. Stern, Rem Koolhaas, Philip Johnson, Michael Graves, Graham Gund and James Stirling, among others.

Venturi was a Fellow of the American Academy in Rome, the American Institute of Architects, The American Academy of Arts and Letters and an Honorary Fellow of the Royal Institute of British Architects.

== Death ==
Venturi died on September 18, 2018, in Philadelphia from complications of Alzheimer's disease. He was 93.

In the wake of Venturi's death, Michael Kimmelman, the current architecture critic for The New York Times, tweeted..."RIP the great, inspiring Robert Venturi who opened millions of eyes and whole new ways of thinking about the richness of our architectural environment, and whose diverse work with Denise Scott Brown contains a mix of wit and humanity that continues to transcend labels and time".

== Notable students ==
Venturi's notable students include Amy Weinstein and Peter Corrigan.

== Selected works ==
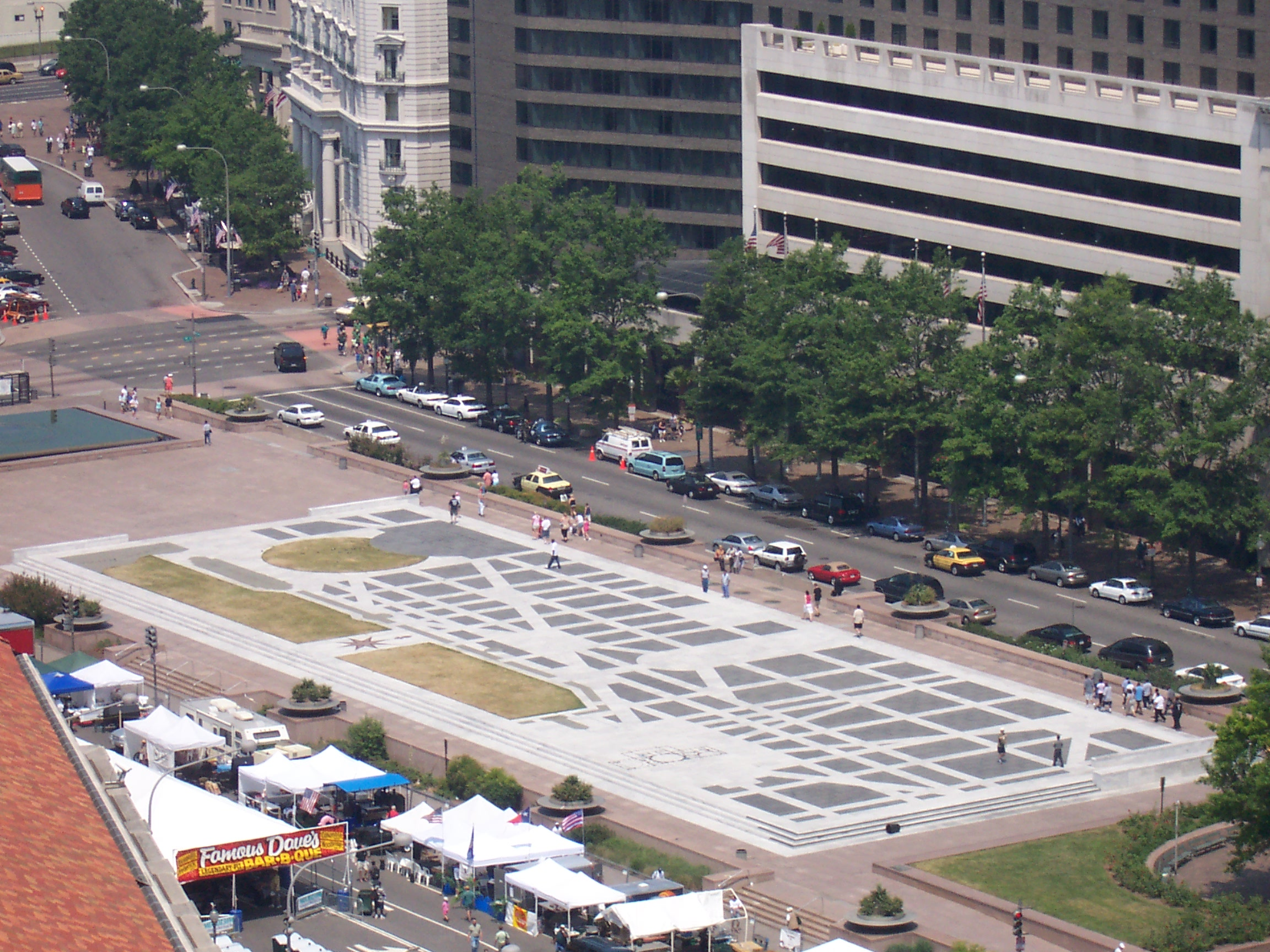
Freedom Plaza in Washington, D.C., with inlay depicting parts of Peter Charles L'Enfant's 1791 plan for the city

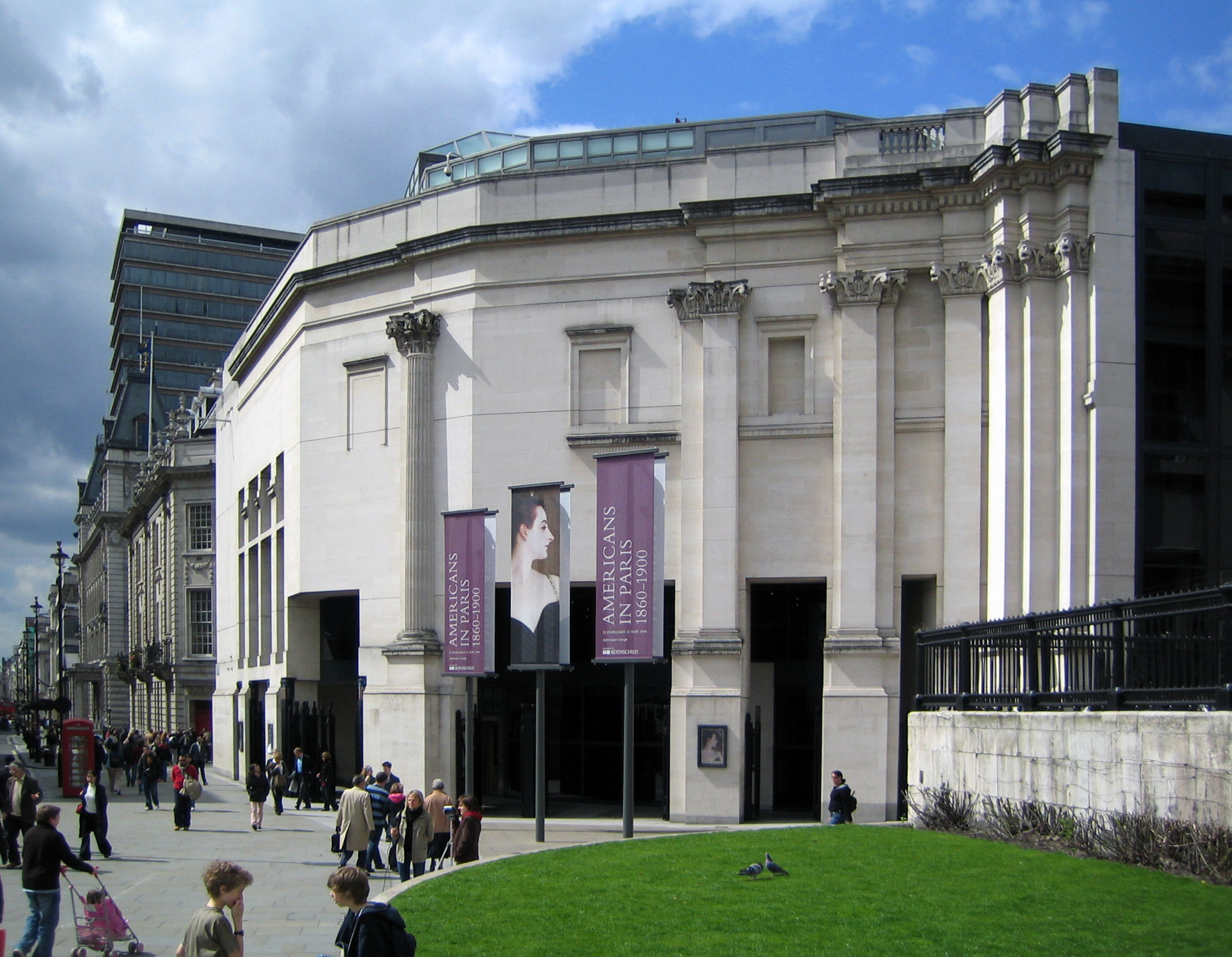
Sainsbury Wing of the National Gallery, London

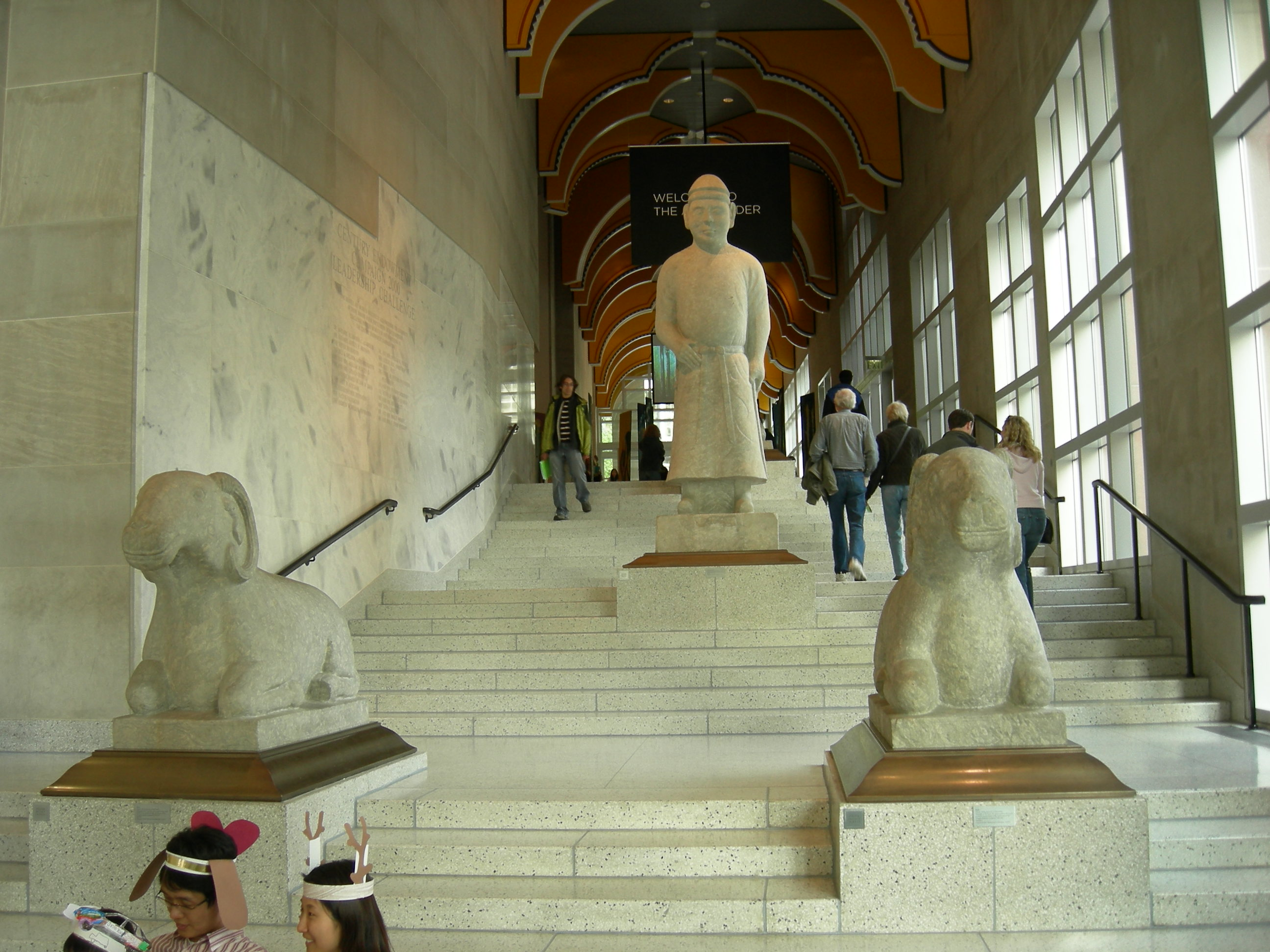
Inside the Seattle Art Museum

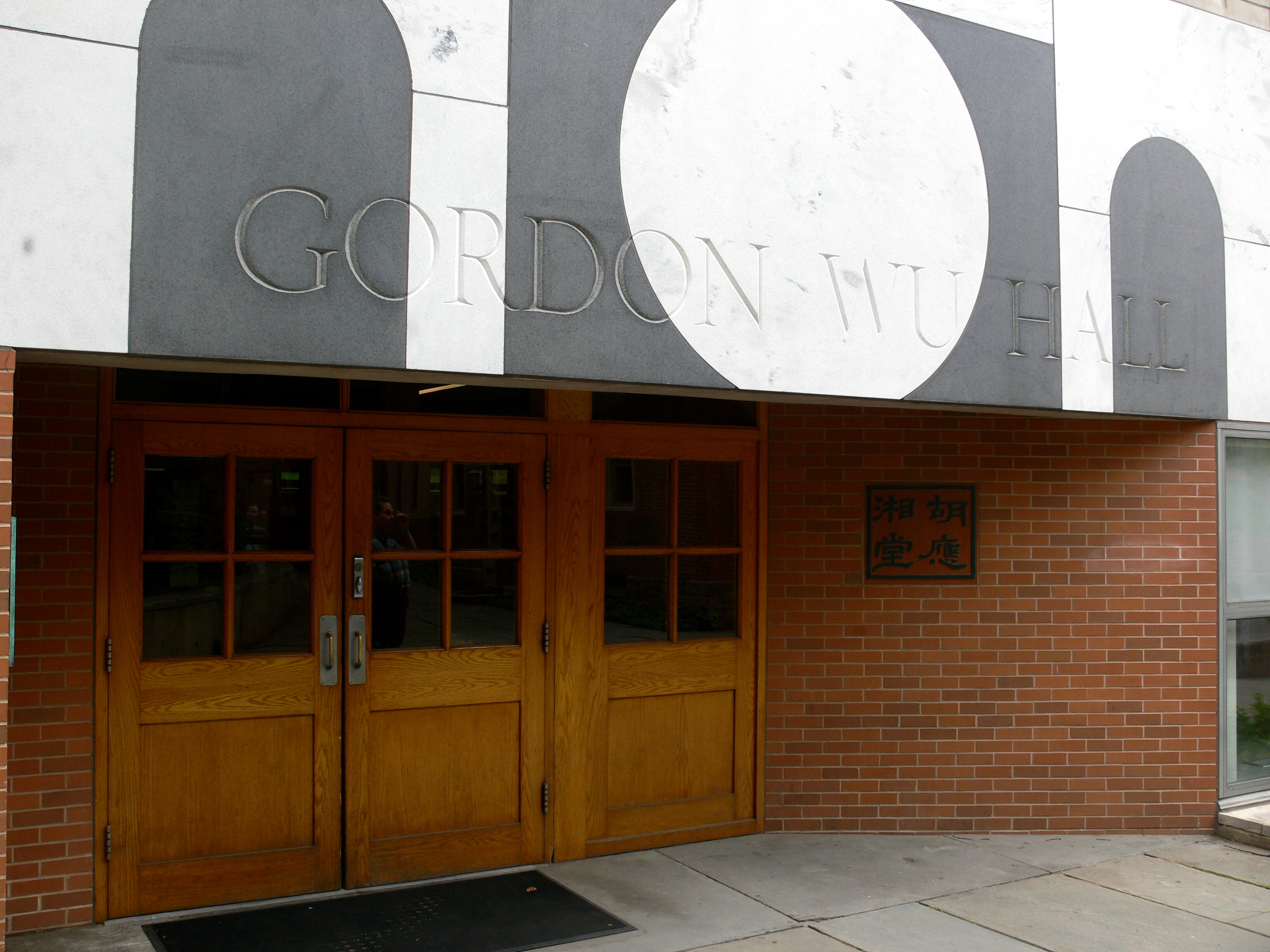
Entrance to Wu Hall at Princeton University

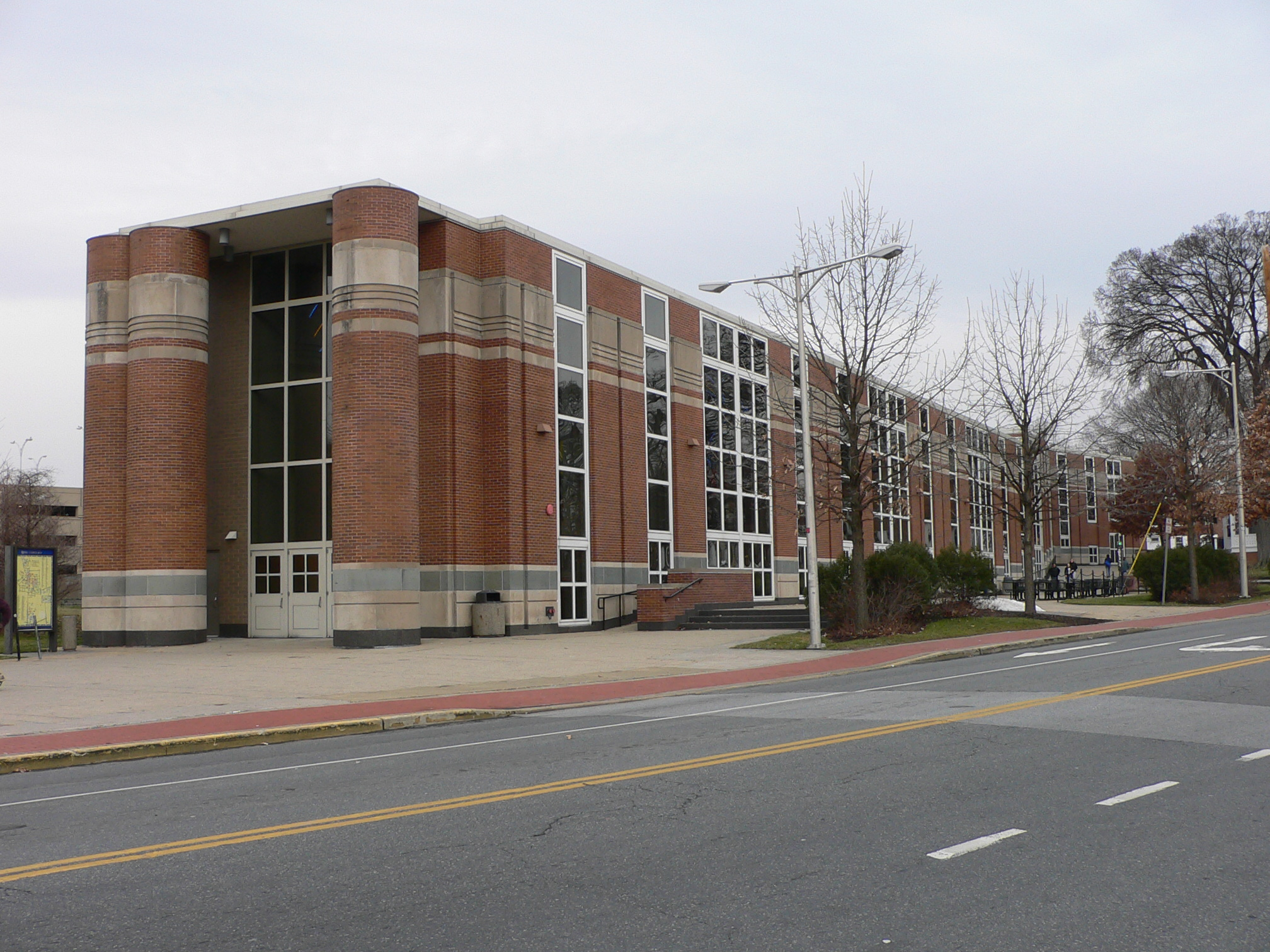
Trabant Student Center at the University of Delaware

- Vanna Venturi House; Philadelphia (1964) won the AIA Twenty-five Year Award and was recognized as a "Masterwork of Modern American Architecture" by the United States Postal Service in May 2005.
- Guild House; Philadelphia (1964)
- The Lieb House located in Barnegat Light, New Jersey was designed by Venturi and his wife Denise Scott Brown and built in 1967. It is best known for the huge number 9 on its front, and the sailboat-shaped window on one side. A Long Island, New York couple purchased this home in early March 2009 for just $1 to save it from demolition, paying at least $100,000 to move it on a barge to Glen Cove, Long Island.
- Fire Station #4; Columbus, Indiana (1968)
- Hartford Stage; Hartford, Connecticut (1968)
- Trubek and Wislocki Houses; Nantucket, Massachusetts (1971)
- Brant House; Greenwich, Connecticut (1972)
- Dixwell Fire Station, New Haven, Connecticut (1974)
- Allen Memorial Art Museum modern addition, Oberlin College, Oberlin, Ohio (1976)
- BASCO Showroom; Philadelphia (1976)
- Franklin Court; Philadelphia (1976)
- Best Products Catalog Showroom; Langhorne, Pennsylvania (1978)
- Western Plaza, later renamed to Freedom Plaza, Washington, D.C. (1980)
- The Presence of the Past exhibition at the Venice Biennale, Italy (1980)
- The Park Regency Terrace Residences, later renamed to Park Regency Condominium Houston (1981)
- Coxe-Hayden House and Studio; Block Island, Rhode Island (1981)
- Abrams House; Pittsburgh, Pennsylvania (1982)
- Gordon Wu Hall; Princeton University, Princeton, New Jersey (1983)
- House in New Castle, Delaware (1983)
- Lewis Thomas Laboratory, Princeton University, New Jersey (1986)
- House in East Hampton, Long Island, New York (1990)
- Gordon and Virginia MacDonald Medical Research Laboratories, UCLA; Los Angeles (1991)
- Sainsbury Wing, National Gallery, London; United Kingdom (1991)
- Seattle Art Museum; Seattle, Washington (1991)
- Restoration of the Fisher Fine Arts Library, University of Pennsylvania; Philadelphia (1991)
- Children's Museum; Houston (1992)
- Charles P. Stevenson Jr. Library, Bard College; Annandale-on-Hudson, New York (1994)
- University of Delaware, Trabant Student Center (1996)
- Museum of Contemporary Art San Diego, La Jolla, California (1996)
- Mielparque Nikko Kirifuri Resort; Nikko National Park, Japan (1997)
- Gonda (Goldschmied) Neurosciences and Genetics Research Center, UCLA; Los Angeles, California (1998)
- Seat of the departmental council; Toulouse, France (1999)
- Frist Campus Center, Princeton University; New Jersey (2000)
- Rauner Special Collections Library, Dartmouth College; Hanover, New Hampshire (2000)
- Perelman Quadrangle, University of Pennsylvania; Philadelphia (2000)
- Baker Memorial Library, Dartmouth College; Hanover, New Hampshire (2002)
- Dumbarton Oaks Library, Harvard University; Washington, D.C. (2005)
- Undergraduate Science Building, Life Sciences Institute and Palmer Commons complex, University of Michigan; Ann Arbor, Michigan (2005)
- Biomedical Biological Science Research Building (BBSRB), University of Kentucky; Lexington, Kentucky (2005)
- Congregation Beth El Synagogue - Sunbury, Pennsylvania (2007)
- Episcopal Academy Chapel; Newtown Square, Pennsylvania (2008)

== Awards ==
External videos
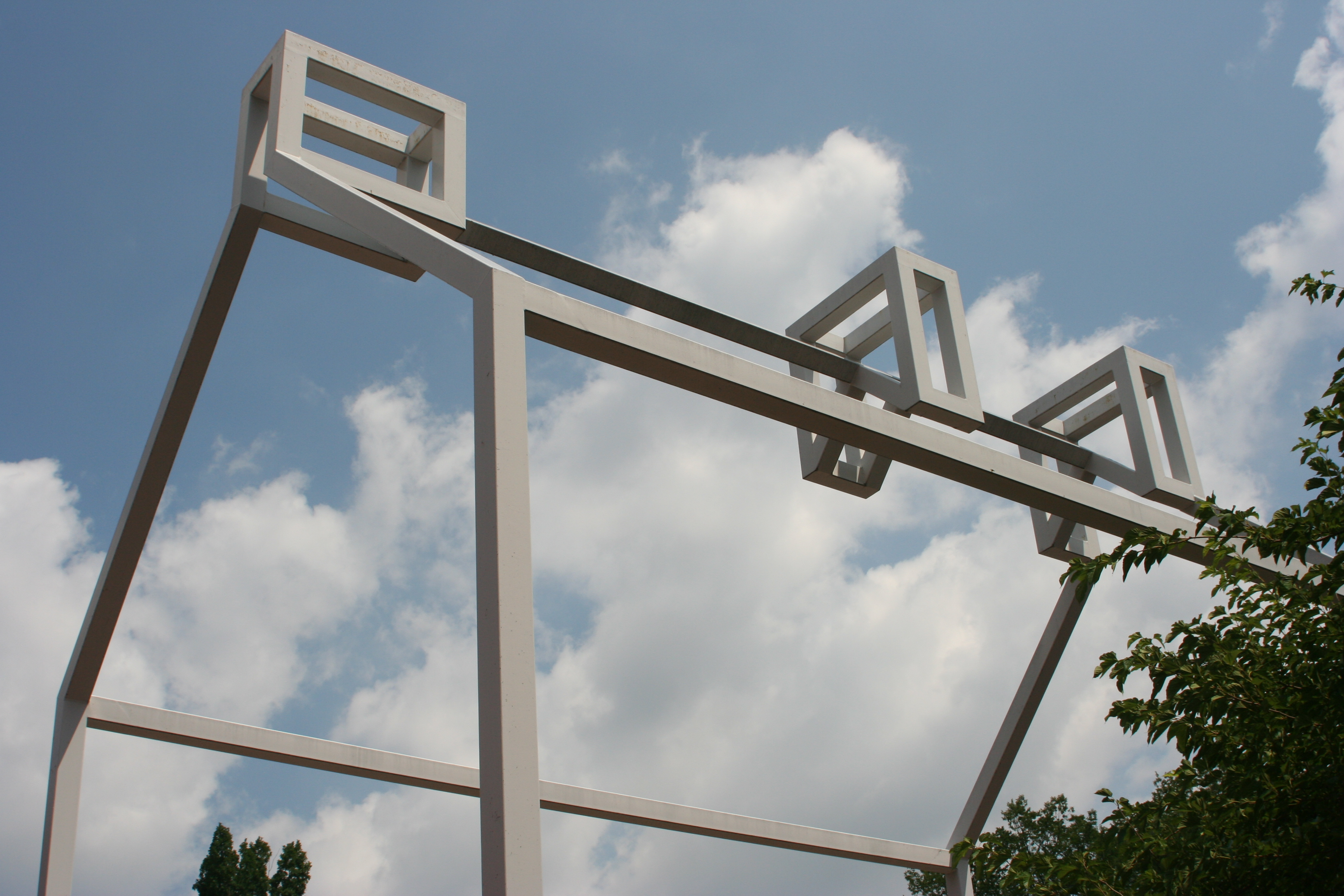
- 2016 AIA Gold Medal: Denise Scott Brown, Hon. FAIA and Robert Venturi, FAIA on YouTube, 3:50
- Robert Venturi: Architecture's Improper Hero Part 1 on YouTube, 14:45,
- Part 2 on YouTube, 7:19, John Thornton
- Architecture as flexibility; form follows functions, Robert Venturi and Denise Scott Brown, 7:34, 1st of 10 parts on the architects discussing their careers, Web of Stories.

- Fellow, American Academy in Rome; 1954-1956
- AIA Medal for Complexity and Contradiction in Architecture; 1978
- Fellow in the American Institute of Architects, 1978
- AIA Architecture Firm Award, to Venturi, Rauch and Scott Brown; 1985
- Commendatore of the Order of Merit, Republic of Italy; 1986
- AIA Twenty-five Year Award to the Vanna Venturi House; 1989
- Elected to the American Academy of Arts and Letters; 1990
- The Pritzker Architecture Prize; 1991
- National Medal of Arts, United States Presidential Award; 1992 (with Denise Scott Brown)
- Commandeur de L'Ordre des Arts et Lettres, Republique Française, Ministère de la Culture et de la Communication; 2000
- Vincent Scully Prize, National Building Museum; 2002 (with Denise Scott Brown)
- Elected to the American Philosophical Society; 2006
- Design Mind Award, Cooper-Hewitt National Design Awards; 2007 (with Denise Scott Brown)
- AIA Gold Medal (with Denise Scott Brown) 2016

== Writings ==
- Robert Venturi (1966). Complexity and Contradiction in Architecture. New York: The Museum of Modern Art Press. ISBN 0-87070-281-5.
- Robert Venturi; Denise Scott Brown; Steven Izenour (1972). Learning from Las Vegas. Revised 1977. Cambridge MA: MIT Press. ISBN 0-262-72006-X.
- Robert Venturi (1998). Iconography and Electronics upon a Generic Architecture: A View from the Drafting Room. MIT Press. ISBN 0-262-72029-9.
- Robert Venturi; Denise Scott Brown (2004). Architecture as Signs and Systems: for a Mannerist Time. Harvard University Press. ISBN 0-674-01571-1.
