= Vanna Venturi House =

Residence in Philadelphia, Pennsylvania

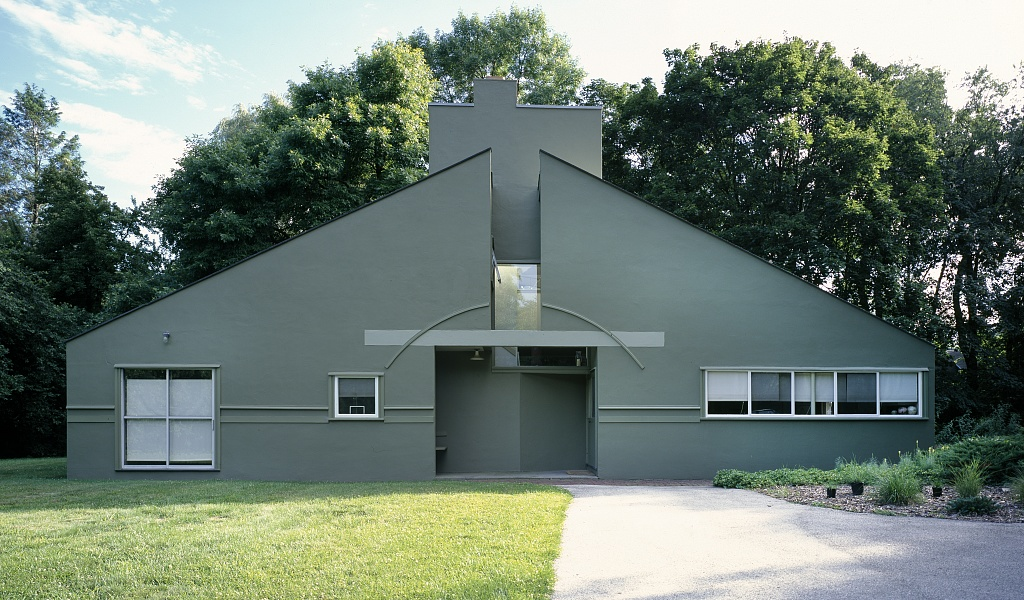
- The front facade from the northeast side of the house

General information
- Type: Residence
- Architectural style: Postmodern
- Location: Chestnut Hill, Philadelphia, Pennsylvania, United States
- Coordinates: 40.0707°N 75.2081°W
- Construction started: 1959 (design)
- Completed: 1964
- Cost: $43,000
- Client: Vanna Venturi

Technical details
- Structural system: light wood frame
- Floor count: 2, plus basement
- Floor area: 1,800 sq ft (170 m^{2})

Design and construction
- Architect: Robert Venturi
- Architecture firm: Venturi and Rauch
- Awards: AIA Twenty-five Year Award 2012 AIA Philadelphia Landmark Building Award

Website
- Venturi, Scott Brown & Associates, Inc.

The Vanna Venturi House, one of the first prominent works of the postmodern architecture movement, is located in the neighborhood of Chestnut Hill in Philadelphia, Pennsylvania. It was designed by architect Robert Venturi for his mother, Vanna Venturi, and built between 1962 and 1964.

The five-room house stands only about 30 feet (9 m) tall, but has a monumental front facade, an effect achieved by intentionally manipulating the architectural elements that indicate a building's scale. Elements such as a non-structural applique arch and "hole in the wall" windows were an open challenge to Modernist orthodoxy, as described in Venturi's 1966 book Complexity and Contradiction in Architecture . Architectural historian Vincent Scully called it "the biggest small building of the second half of the twentieth century."

== Client and architect, mother and son ==
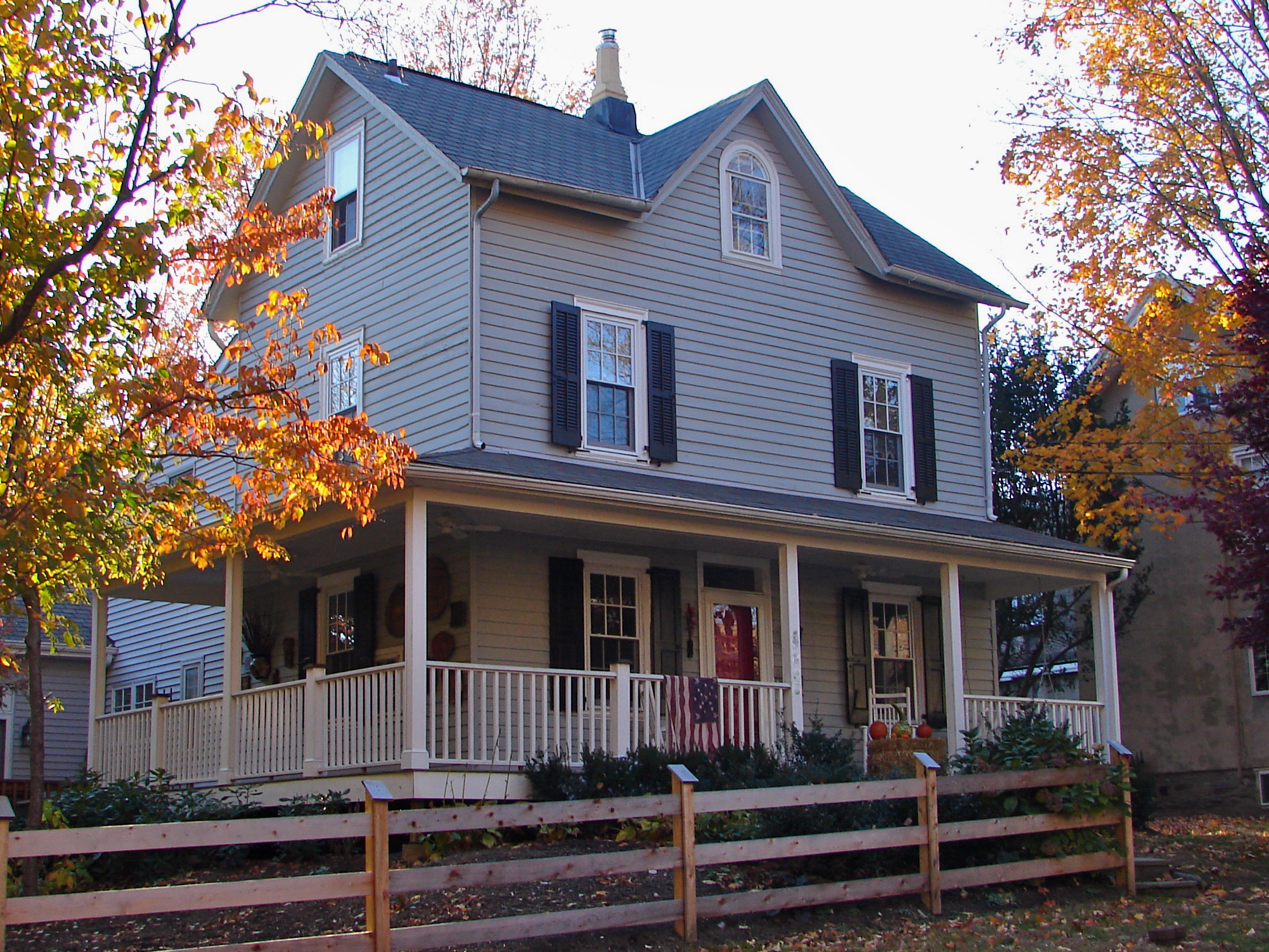
A 19th century house next to Vanna Venturi House

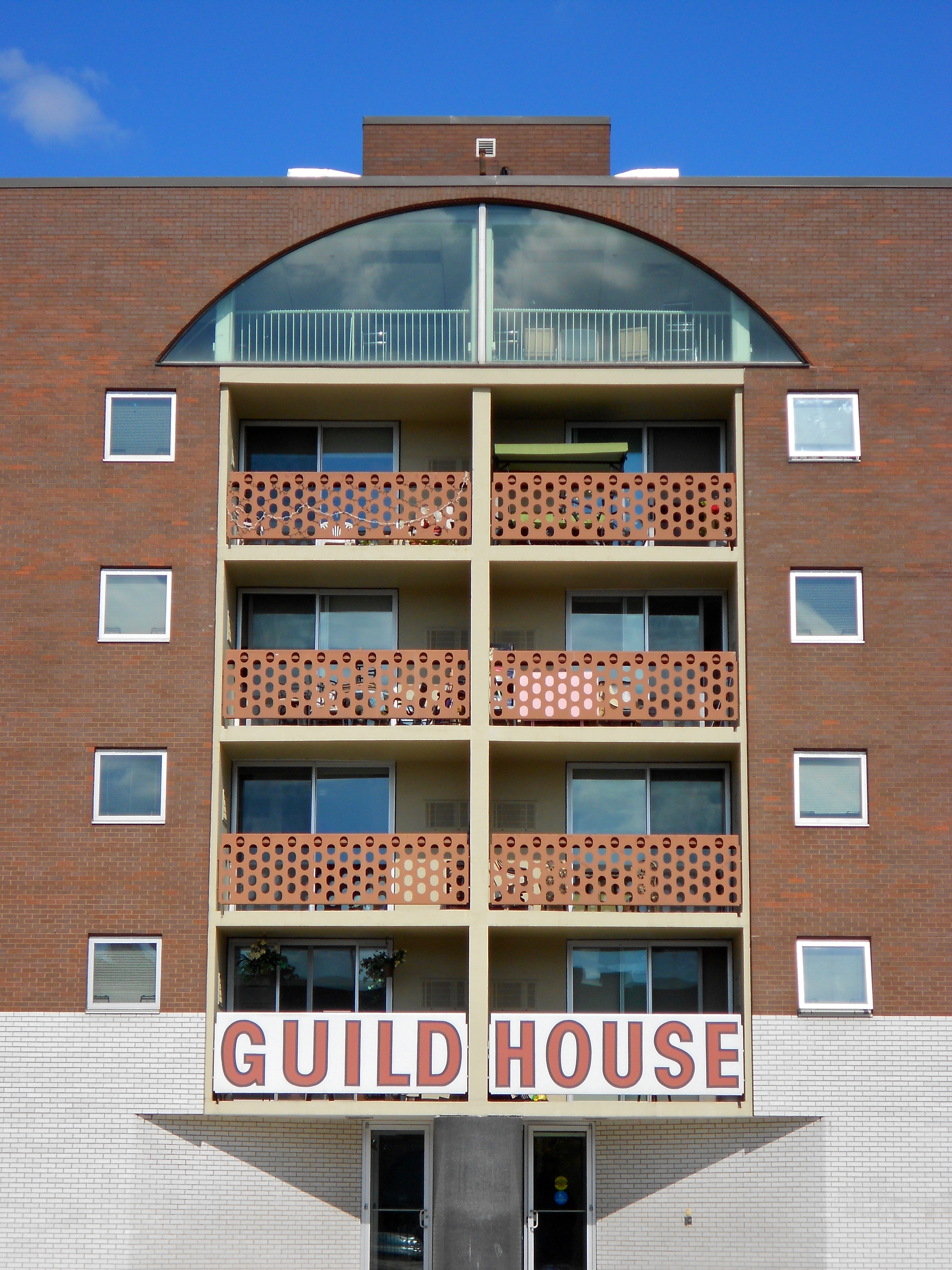
The main entrance to the Guild House

The design of "Mother's House", as architect Robert Venturi frequently called the house, was affected by Vanna (née Lanzetta) Venturi both as the client whose needs had to be met and as the mother who helped develop the architect's talent and personality.

Vanna was a feminist, socialist, pacifist, and vegetarian with an active intellectual life, reading books mostly on history, current events, and biography. She was born to Italian immigrant parents in Washington, DC in 1893. She dropped out of high school because her family could not afford to buy her a coat, so she was essentially self-educated. At 29, she married fruit-and-produce merchant Robert Venturi Sr. Her only child, Robert Jr. was born in 1925. Possibly because of her liberal views she perceived herself as an "outsider" and became a Quaker. Robert Jr. said, "I never went to public school: pledging allegiance to the flag — 'coercive patriotism' my mother called it — was anathema to her." The family made summer trips to Arden, Delaware, and Rose Valley, Pennsylvania, two communities organized by architect William Lightfoot Price, who was inspired by the Arts and Crafts Movement and the then-radical economics of Henry George. In Rose Valley, the family attended plays by George Bernard Shaw at the Hedgerow Theater.

The family attended the Quakers' Philadelphia Yearly Meeting at the Arch Street Friends Meeting House. Robert Jr. attended a Quaker grade school, then the Episcopal Academy, and later Princeton University, earning both bachelor's and master's degrees. From 1954 to 1956 he was a Rome Prize Fellow at the American Academy in Rome. He then taught architectural theory at the University of Pennsylvania, working with Louis Kahn. In 1960, Venturi met fellow lecturer and future partner Denise Scott Brown at the university. As a professional architect, he worked in the offices of Eero Saarinen, Louis Kahn, and Oscar Stonorov.

In 1959, Robert Sr. died, leaving his wife enough money to build the house and live comfortably. The designs for the house by Robert Jr. evolved over four years, but the architect noted only two indications of disagreement from his client. When the work was about three-fourths complete, she looked at the traditional 19th-century house next door and remarked "Oh, isn't that a nice house." She also rejected the marble floor in the dining area, considering it to be ostentatious, but relented as the house was nearing completion. Along with the Guild House, an apartment house for the elderly, also completed in 1964, the Vanna Venturi House was Venturi's first work as an independent architect.

As a widow nearing the age of 70 as the house was completed, Vanna required that all her daily routine could be conducted on one floor, possibly with the help of a live-in caretaker. Thus the first floor plan contains all the main rooms of the house: the master bedroom, a full bathroom, the caretaker's room, the kitchen and a living/dining area. She did not drive, so there is no garage. Her son, the architect, occupied the second floor, which contains a bedroom/studio with a large lunette window, a private balcony, and a half-bath on the stair landing. There is a large side porch and a basement with ample storage areas. The house was also specifically designed for her antiques and reproduction furniture, which she had collected over 50 years.

Robert lived in the house until a few months after his 1967 marriage to Denise Scott Brown. Vanna Venturi lived in the house from 1964 though 1973, often lecturing visiting architects on architecture and the architect. In 1973 she moved to a nursing home, and died in 1975. The house was sold in 1973 to Thomas P. Hughes, an historian, author, and university professor, and his wife, Agatha, an editor and artist. The Hughes family maintained and lived in the house, keeping it as original and authentic as possible, until 2016 when it was sold to a local, private buyer.

== Design ==
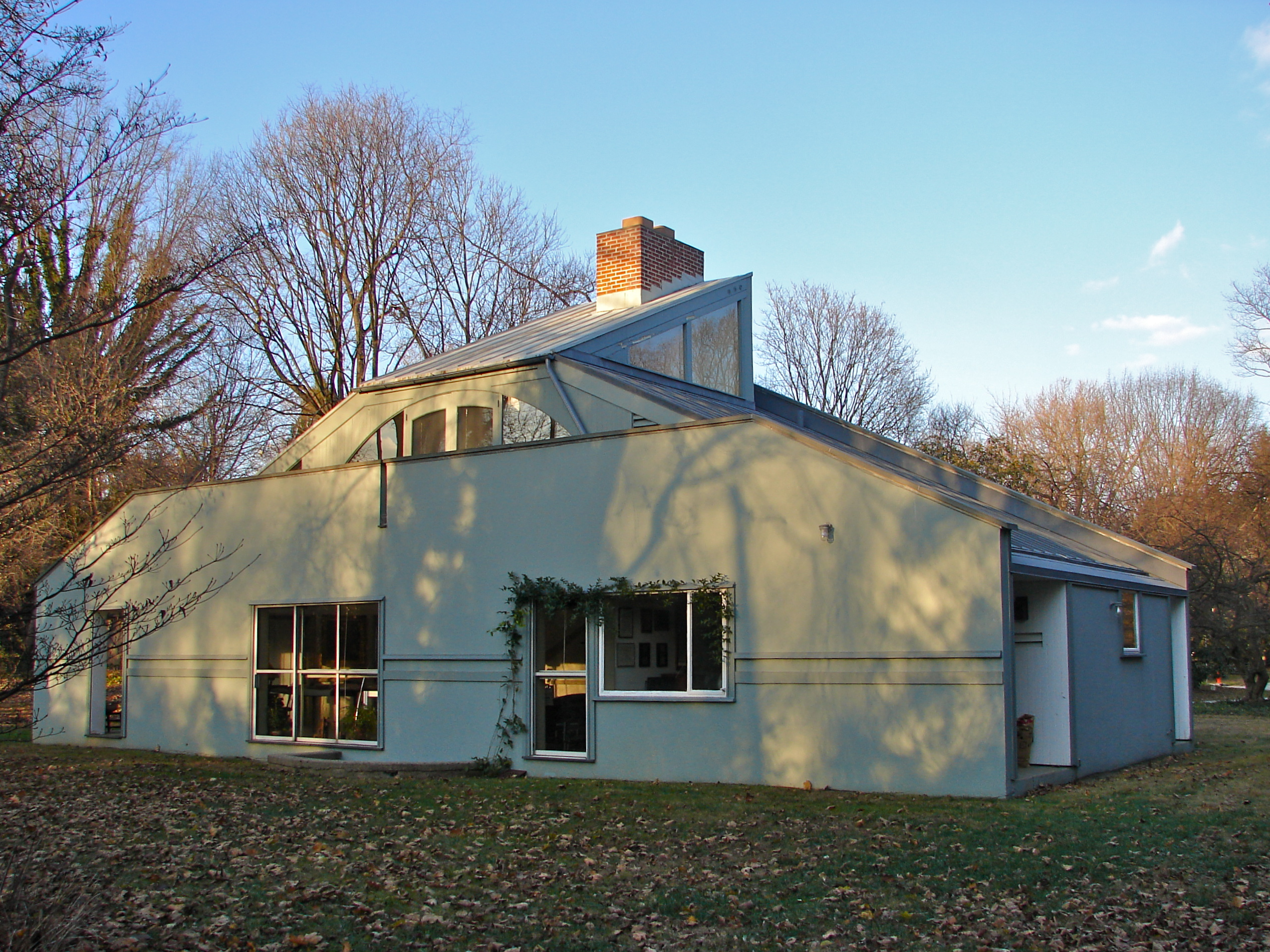
View from the rear of the house on its south

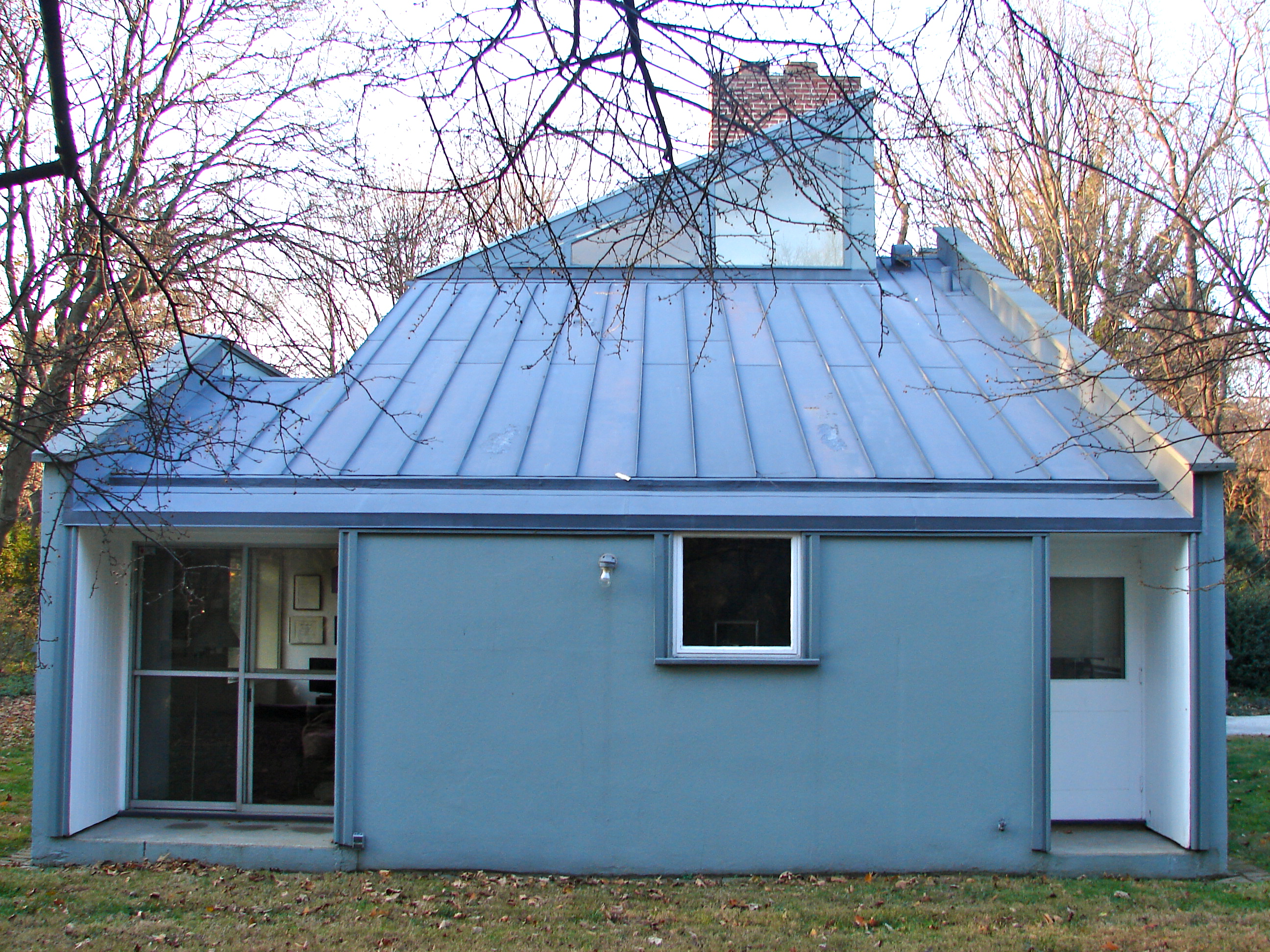
View of the house from its southeastern side

Venturi designed the Vanna Venturi House at the same time that he wrote his anti-Modernist polemic Complexity and Contradiction in Architecture in which he outlined his own architectural ideas. During the writing he redesigned the house at least five times in fully worked-out versions. A description of the house is included in the book and the house is viewed as an embodiment of the ideas in the book. He states:

Architects can no longer afford to be intimidated by the puritanically moral language of orthodox Modern architecture. I like elements which are hybrid rather than "pure," compromising rather than "clear," distorted rather than "straightforward."... I am for messy vitality over obvious unity. I include the non sequitur and proclaim duality.

Many of the basic elements of the house are a reaction against standard Modernist architectural elements: the pitched roof rather than flat roof, the emphasis on the central hearth and chimney, a closed ground floor "set firmly on the ground" rather than the Modernist columns and glass walls which open up the ground floor. On the front elevation the broken pediment or gable and a purely ornamental applique arch reflect a return to Mannerist architecture and a rejection of Modernism. Thus the house is a direct break from Modern architecture, designed in order to disrupt and contradict formal Modernist aesthetics. More simply, Venturi demonstrated his intentions by figuratively giving the finger to the Modernist establishment.

The site of the house is flat, with a long driveway connecting it to the street. Venturi placed the parallel walls of the house perpendicular to the main axis of the site, defined by the driveway, rather than the usual placement along the axis. Unusually, the gable is placed on the long side of the rectangle formed by the house, and there is no matching gable at the rear. The chimney is emphasized by the centrally placed room on the second floor, but the actual chimney is small and off-center. The effect is to magnify the scale of the small house and make the facade appear to be monumental. The scale magnifying effects are not carried over to the sides and rear of the house, thus making the house appear to be both large and small from different angles.

The central chimney and staircase dominate the interior of the house.

Two vertical elements — the fireplace-chimney and the stair — compete, as it were, for central position. And each of these elements, one essentially solid, the other essentially void, compromises in its shape and position — that is, inflects toward the other to make a unity of the duality of the central core they constitute. On one side the fireplace distorts in shape and moves over a little, as does its chimney; on the other side the stair suddenly constricts its width and distorts its path because of the chimney.

The themes of scale, contradiction, and "whimsy" – "not inappropriate to an individual house," can be seen at the top of the stair, that seems to go from the second floor to a non-existent third floor.

On one level, it goes nowhere and is whimsical; at another level, it is like a ladder against a wall from which to wash the high window and paint the clerestory. The change in scale of the stair on this floor further contrasts with that change of scale in the other direction at the bottom.

The house was constructed with intentional formal architectural, historical and aesthetic contradictions. Venturi has compared the iconic front facade to "a child's drawing of a house." Yet he has also written, "This building recognizes complexities and contradictions: it is both complex and simple, open and closed, big and little; some of its elements are good on one level and bad on another its order accommodates the generic elements and of the house in general, and the circumstantial elements of a house in particular."

The Swiss architectural theorist Stanislaus von Moos views the monumental facade as a reference to Michelangelo's Porta Pia, the back wall to Palladio's Nymphaeum at Villa Barbaro, and the broken pediments to the facade of Moretti's Il Girasole house. Il Girasole was also cited directly by Venturi in Complexity and Contradiction in architecture.

== Neighborhood ==
Chestnut Hill is a residential neighborhood in the northwestern part of Philadelphia. It was settled in the early eighteenth century and still has many stone buildings from that period. In the second half of the nineteenth century many Victorian mansions were built in the area. Several residences within a few blocks of the Vanna Venturi House were designed by well-known architects. The entire neighborhood is part of the Chestnut Hill Historic District on the National Register of Historic Places.

The Houston-Sauveur House, built in 1885 by architects G. W. & W. D. Hewitt, is one of many Victorian mansions in the immediate neighborhood. Nearby modern architecture includes Louis Kahn's Esherick House and a house in the International Style designed by Kenneth Day. A bit further away is Cherokee Village, a 104-unit apartment complex designed by Oscar Stonorov in the 1950s. Venturi worked on this project as a draftsman. Two other houses designed by Stonorov, and the house of Venturi's long-time partner, John Rauch, are near the apartment complex.

The Esherick and Vanna Venturi Houses invite comparison, having been built within two years and one block of each other by Philadelphia's best-known 20th century architects. In Kahn's building, proportion and symmetry bind the building together; in Venturi's the building's elements appear as fragments of the whole. The Esherick House seems devoid of ornament, while the Venturi House has a large, purely ornamental arch on its facade. The Esherick House is essentially symmetric, but the Venturi House contradicts its basic symmetry with asymmetric windows.

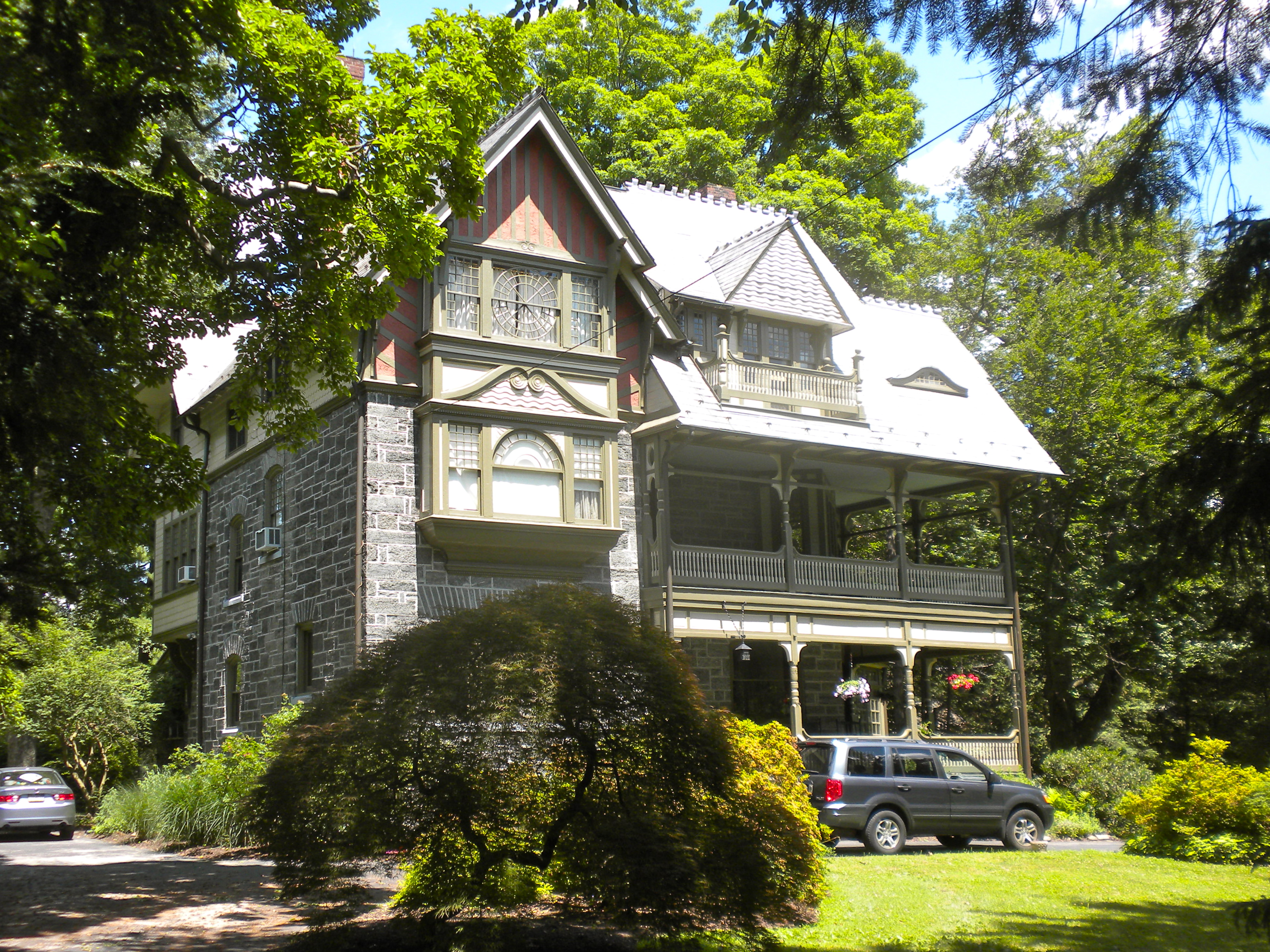
Houston-Sauveur House (1885).

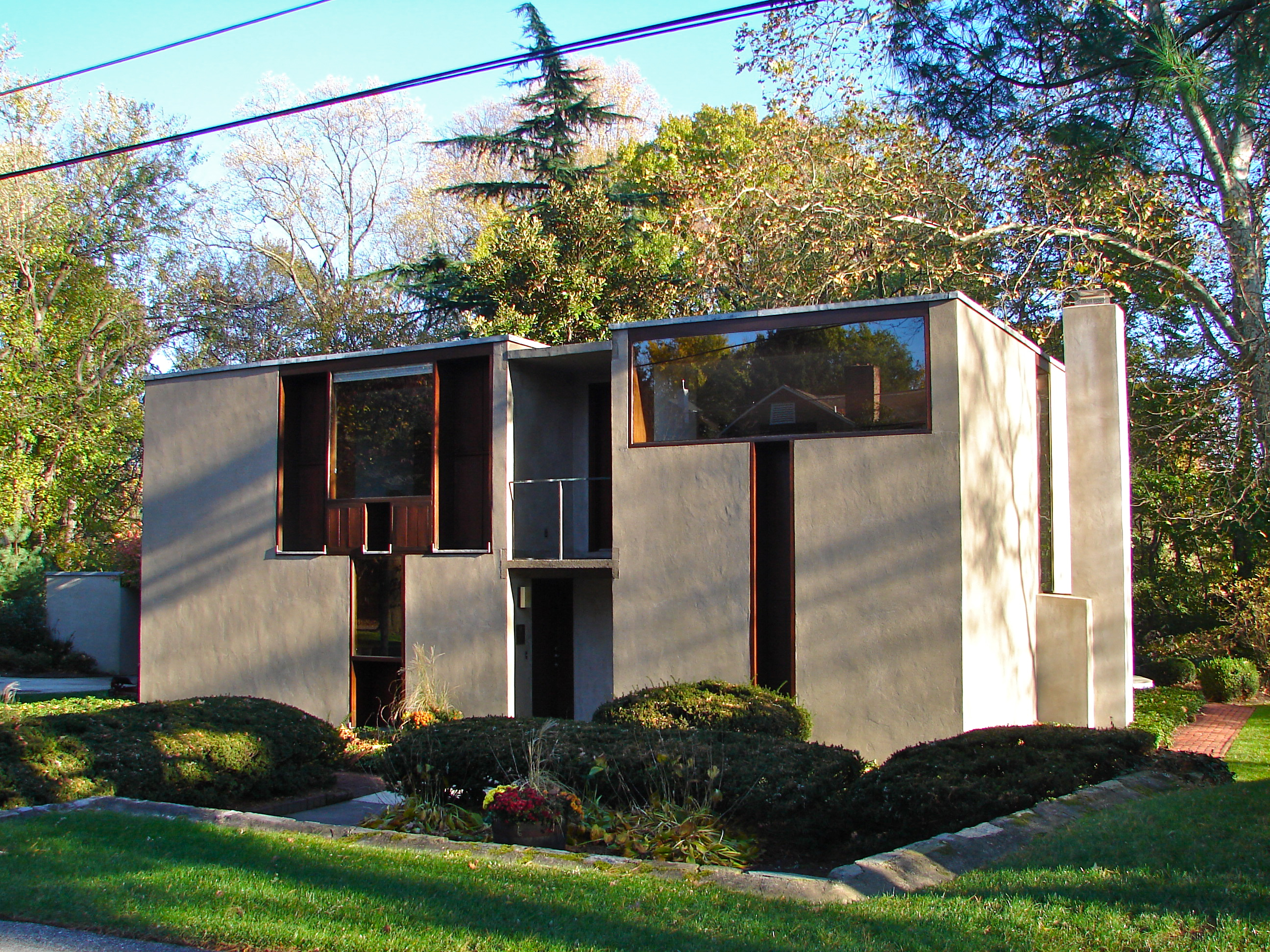
Kahn's Esherick House.

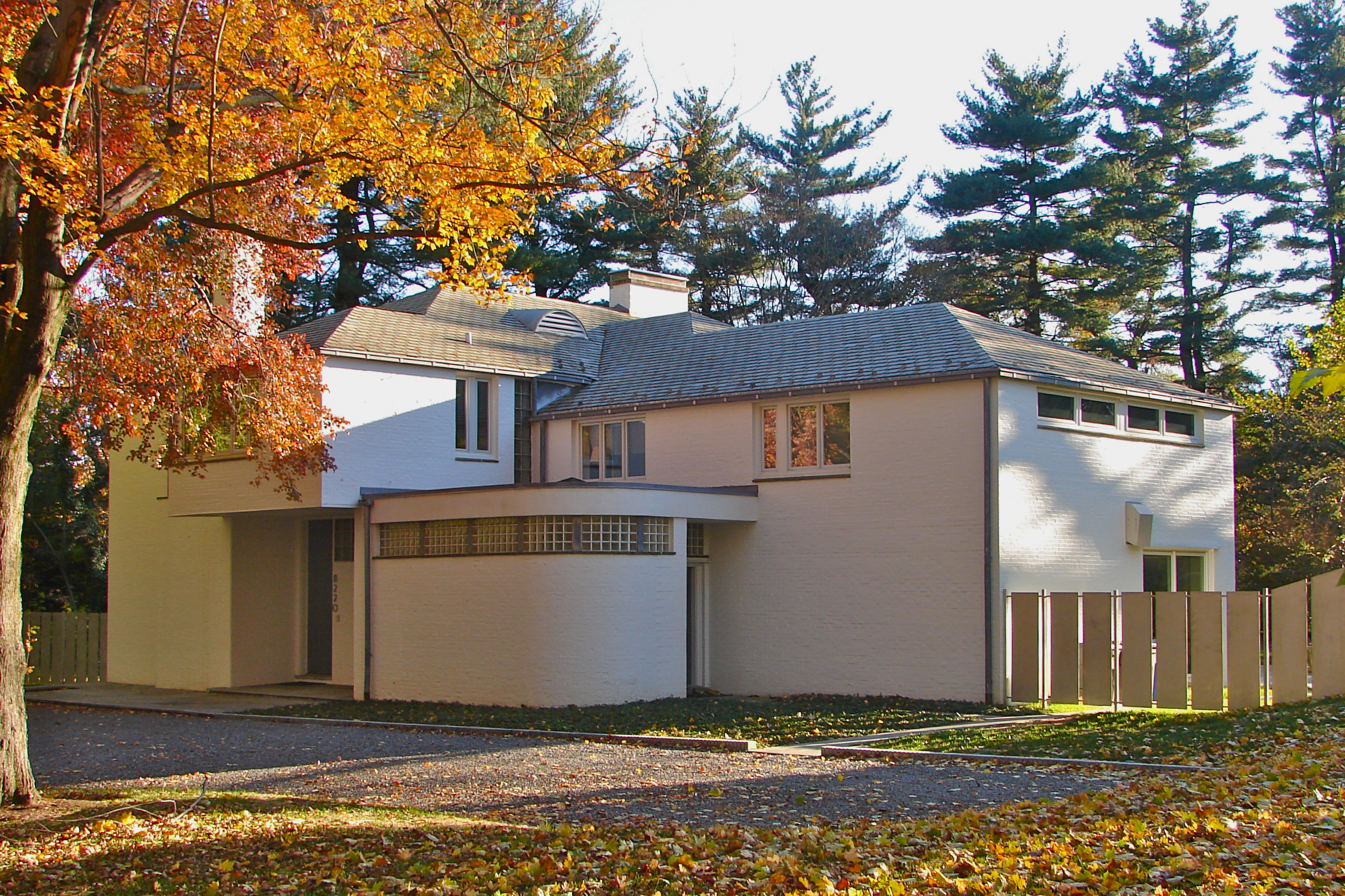
House designed by Kenneth Day.

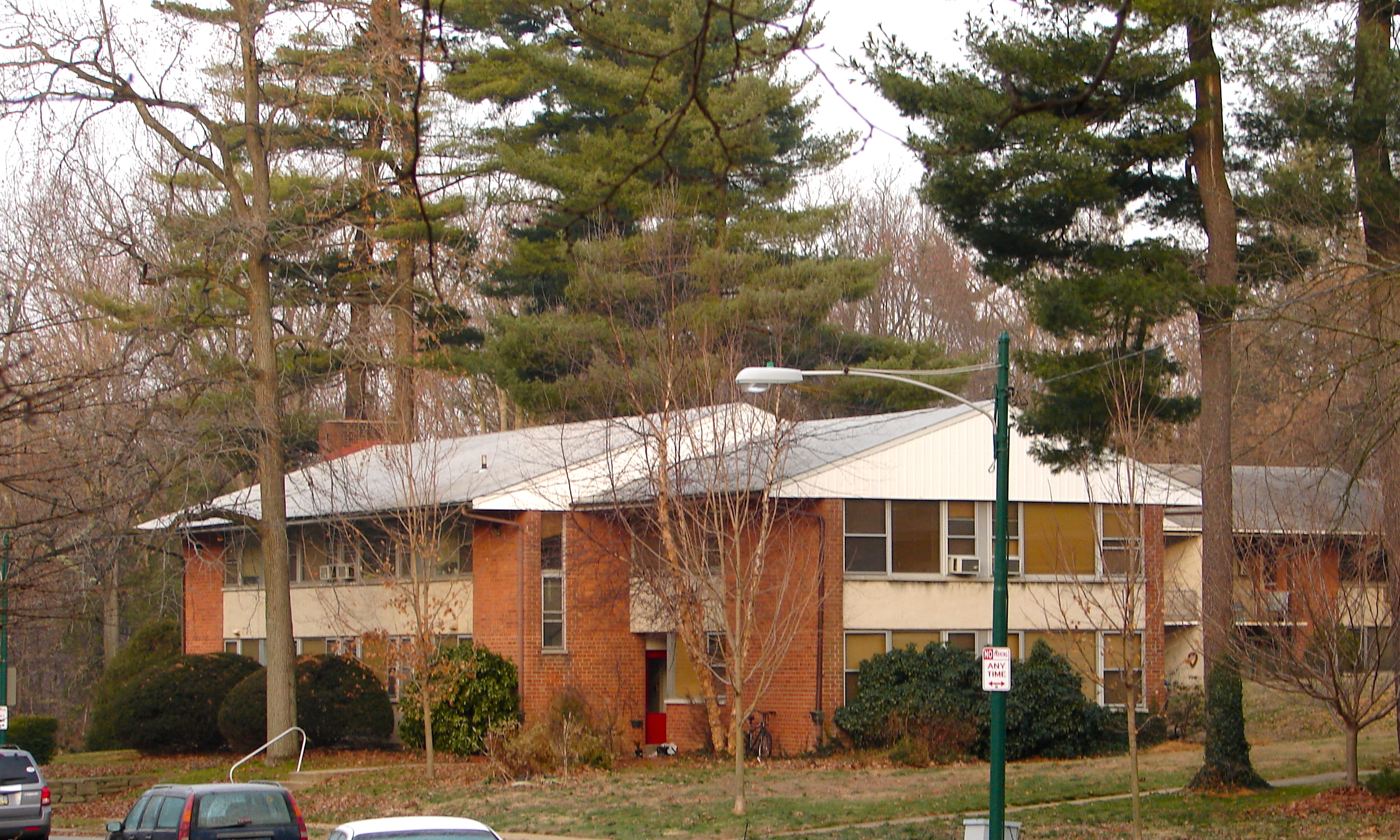
Cherokee Village.

== Recognition ==
External videos
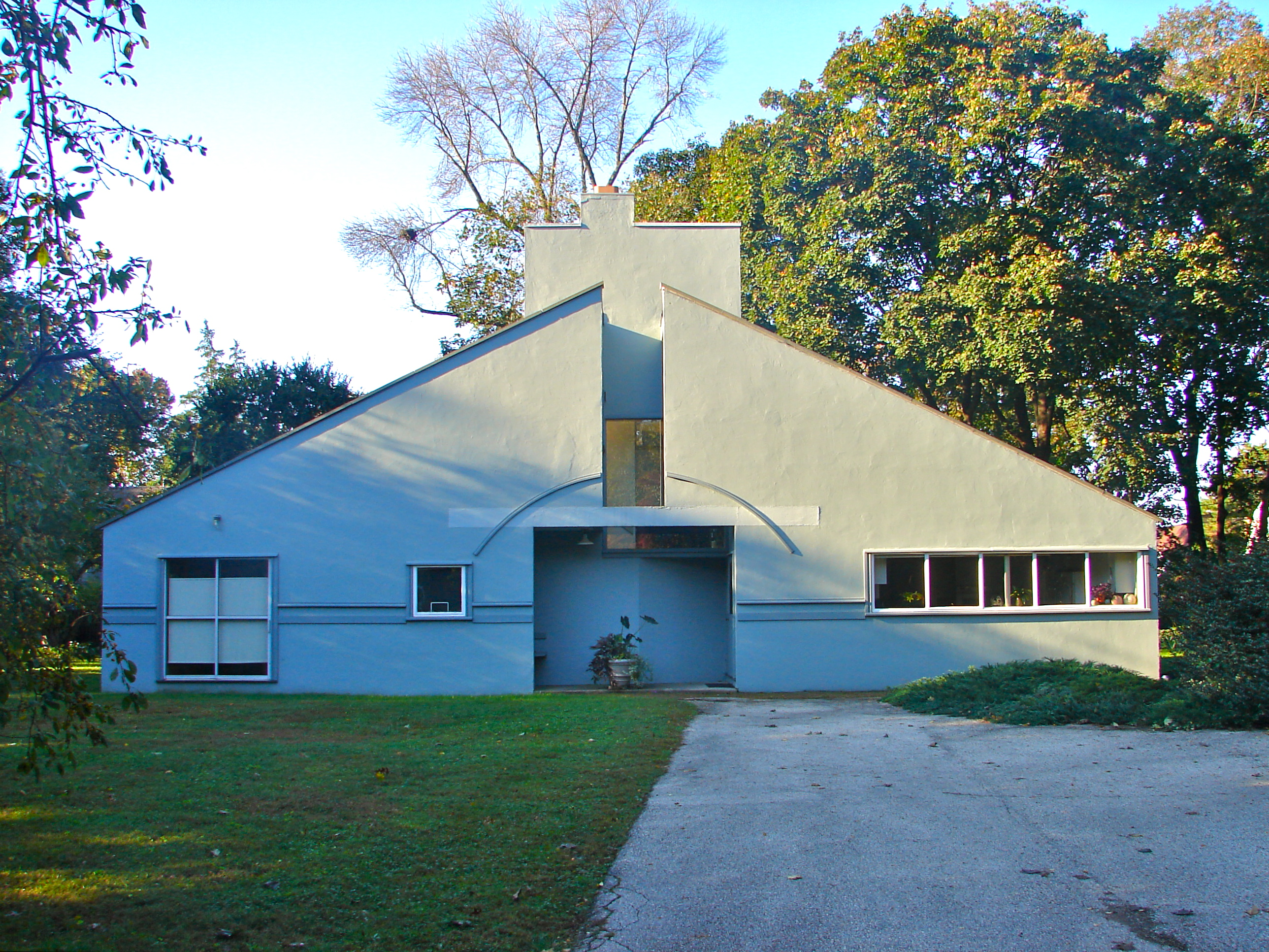
- 10 Buildings that Changed America #9 Vanna Venturi House, WTTW,

In 1989, the house won the prestigious Twenty-five Year Award, awarded by the American Institute of Architects to a single project each year that has "stood the test of time for 25 to 35 years." Two years later Venturi was awarded the Pritzker Architecture Prize for work that "has produced consistent and significant contributions to humanity ... through the art of architecture." Denise Scott Brown, despite working together with Venturi since 1960, was controversially not included in the Pritzker Prize.

In 2005, the United States Postal Service featured the house on a postage stamp in a series of "Twelve masterworks of modern American architecture." Venturi's cardboard and wood models of the house, at several design stages, are in the collection of the Museum of Modern Art in New York. In 2012 the Vanna Venturi House was awarded the 2012 AIA Philadelphia Landmark Building Award. The house, including the interior, and the architect were featured on the WTTW television production: 10 Buildings That Changed America.

== Sources ==
- Davies, Colin (2006). Key houses of the twentieth century: plans, sections and elevations. Laurence King Publishing. pp. 143–145. ISBN 978-1-85669-463-6.
- Friedman, Alice T. (2007). "6". Women and the Making of the Modern House. Yale University Press. pp. 188–213. ISBN 978-0-300-11789-9.
- Robert Venturi; Vincent Scully; Aldo Rossi (1997). Frederic Schwartz (ed.). Mother's House: The Evolution of Vanna Venturi's House in Chestnut Hill. DIANE Publishing Company. p. 224. ISBN 978-0-7881-5126-2.
- Unwin, Simon (2003). "Case Study 5 – Vanna Venturi House". Analysing architecture. Psychology Press. pp. 327–334. ISBN 978-0-415-30685-0.
- Venturi, Robert (1977). Complexity and contradiction in architecture, 2nd edition. The Museum of Modern Art. p. 132. ISBN 978-0-87070-282-2.
