= Fire Station Number 4 (Columbus, Indiana) =

Fire station in Indiana, United States

Coordinates: 39°13′26″N 85°52′03″W

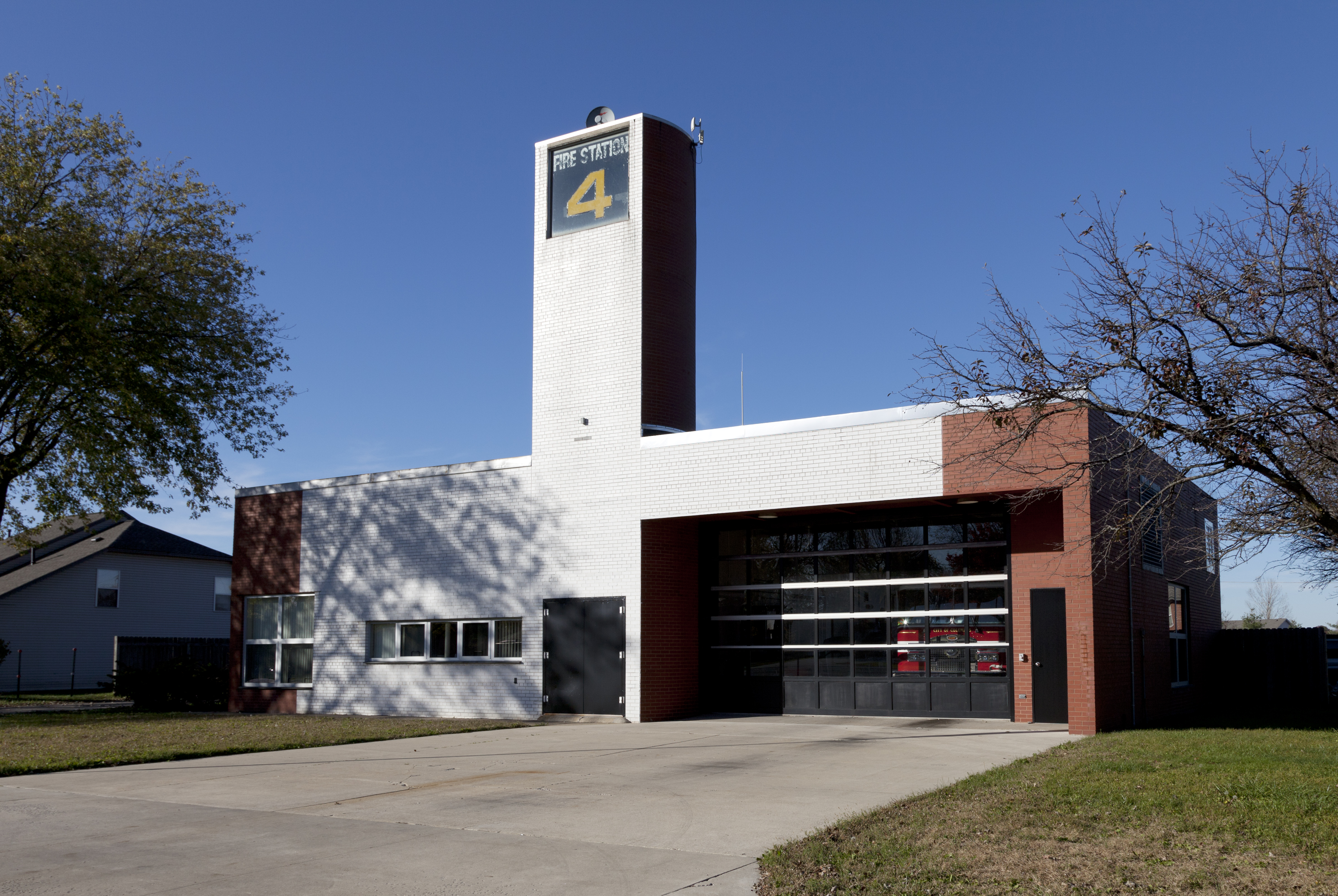
- Fire Station Number 4

General information
- Location: 4730 East 25th Street, Columbus, Indiana, United States
- Construction started: 1967
- Completed: 1968

Design and construction
- Architects: Robert Venturi and Denise Scott Brown

Fire Station No. 4 in Columbus, Indiana, United States, is a building designed by architect Robert Venturi. It is architecturally significant for being an early example of postmodern architecture.

== Architecture ==
In 1967, Venturi was asked by the fire department of the city of Columbus to design a fire station, which was to be an "ordinary building that was easy to maintain". The design features a trapezoidal plan, with a semicircular tower serving as the main entrance to the building. A notable feature of the tower is the large yellow number 4 located at its top.
